= Lists of people from Kansas =

This is a list of lists of people from Kansas. Inclusion in this list should be reserved for existing Wikipedia lists about people from the American state of Kansas.

== List of people from Kansas ==
The primary list contains notable people who were either born, raised, or have lived for a significant period of time in Kansas. The list is divided into many categories and sub-categories.

- List of people from Kansas
- List of Kansas suffragists

== Geography ==
=== Lists of people by county ===
The state of Kansas has 105 counties. The following counties have list articles for people from that county:

- List of people from Atchison County, Kansas
- List of people from Butler County, Kansas
- List of people from Clay County, Kansas
- List of people from Cloud County, Kansas
- List of people from Cowley County, Kansas
- List of people from Dickinson County, Kansas
- List of people from Ellis County, Kansas
- List of people from Franklin County, Kansas
- List of people from Harvey County, Kansas
- List of people from Johnson County, Kansas
- List of people from Leavenworth County, Kansas
- List of people from Lyon County, Kansas
- List of people from McPherson County, Kansas
- List of people from Republic County, Kansas

=== Lists of people by city ===
The following cities have list articles for people from that city:

- List of people from Dodge City, Kansas
- List of people from Emporia, Kansas
- List of people from Garden City, Kansas
- List of people from Great Bend, Kansas
- List of people from Hays, Kansas
- List of people from Hutchinson, Kansas
- List of people from Junction City, Kansas
- List of people from Kansas City, Kansas
- List of people from Lawrence, Kansas
- List of people from Leavenworth, Kansas
- List of people from Leawood, Kansas
- List of people from Manhattan, Kansas
- List of people from Olathe, Kansas
- List of people from Overland Park, Kansas
- List of people from Pittsburg, Kansas
- List of people from Prairie Village, Kansas
- List of people from Salina, Kansas
- List of people from Shawnee, Kansas
- List of people from Topeka, Kansas
- List of people from Wichita, Kansas

== Focus areas ==
=== Academics ===
- Commandant of the United States Army Command and General Staff College
- List of Emporia State University people
- List of Kansas State University people
- List of University of Kansas people
- List of Washburn University alumni
- List of Wichita State University people

=== Athletics ===
Note: athletic lists are sorted by current conference affiliation, or last affiliation if program is defunct.

==== Big 12 Conference ====
- List of Kansas Jayhawks head football coaches
- List of Kansas Jayhawks in the NFL draft
- List of Kansas State Wildcats head football coaches
- List of Kansas State Wildcats in the NFL draft

==== Heart of America Athletic Conference ====
- List of Baker Wildcats head football coaches
- List of Benedictine Ravens head football coaches
- List of MidAmerica Nazarene Pioneers head football coaches

==== Kansas Collegiate Athletic Conference ====
- List of Bethany Terrible Swedes head football coaches
- List of Bethel Threshers head football coaches
- List of Kansas Collegiate Athletic Conference people
- List of Kansas Wesleyan Coyotes head football coaches
- List of McPherson Bulldogs head football coaches
- List of Ottawa Braves head football coaches
- List of Saint Mary Spires head football coaches
- List of Southwestern Moundbuilders head football coaches
- List of Sterling Warriors head football coaches

==== Mid-America Intercollegiate Athletics Association ====
- List of Emporia State Hornets head football coaches
- List of Emporia State Hornets in the NFL draft
- List of Fort Hays State Tigers head football coaches
- List of Pittsburg State Gorillas head football coaches
- List of Washburn Ichabods head football coaches

==== Midlands Collegiate Athletic Conference ====
- List of Haskell Indian Nations Fighting Indians head football coaches

==== Missouri Valley Conference ====
- List of Wichita State Shockers head football coaches

=== Crime ===
- List of people executed in Kansas
- List of inmates of United States Penitentiary, Leavenworth

=== Military ===
- Commandant of the United States Army Command and General Staff College

=== Politicians ===
Federal

- Kansas's congressional delegations
  - List of United States representatives from Kansas
  - List of United States senators from Kansas

State

- List of governors of Kansas
- List of justices of the Kansas Supreme Court
- List of speakers of the Kansas House of Representatives

Local

- List of mayors of Kansas City, Kansas
- List of mayors of Topeka, Kansas
- List of mayors of Wichita, Kansas

== See also ==
- Index of Kansas-related articles
