= List of people from Hays, Kansas =

This is a list of people from Hays, Kansas, United States.

== Academia ==
- Maurice L. Albertson (1918-2009), civil engineer, professor, Peace Corps co-founder

== Arts and entertainment ==
=== Film, television, and theatre ===
- Robert Bogue (1964– ), actor
- Buffalo Bill Cody (1846–1917), showman, frontiersman, scout
- Rebecca Staab (1961– ), actress

=== Folklore ===
- Elizabeth Polly (c. 1843–1867), the so-called "Blue Light Lady"

=== Journalism ===
- John L. Allen Jr. (1965– ), reporter, editor, analyst
- Melissa McDermott, news anchor

=== Literature ===
- Elizabeth Bacon Custer (1842–1933), writer

=== Music ===
- Rob Beckley (1975– ), musician
- Petrowitsch Bissing (1871–1961), violin instructor

=== Other visual arts ===
- Hart Wood (1880–1957), architect

== Business ==
- Philip Anschutz (1939– ), business magnate

== Crime and law enforcement ==
- Clay Allison (1840–1887), gunfighter
- Robert Courtney (1952– ), fraudster, pharmacist
- Wild Bill Hickok (1837–1876), gunfighter, lawman

== Military ==
- Calamity Jane (1852–1903), frontierswoman, scout
- George Custer (1839–1876), U.S. Army Bvt. Maj. General

== Politics ==
=== National ===
- Jerry Moran (1954– ), U.S. Senator from Kansas
- Kathryn O'Loughlin McCarthy (1894–1952), U.S. Representative from Kansas
- Frances Tilton Weaver (1904–2003), feminist legal pioneer

=== State ===
- Jeff Colyer (1960– ), 47th Governor of Kansas
- Travis Couture-Lovelady, Kansas state legislator
- Eber Phelps (1951– ), Kansas state legislator

== Sports ==
=== American football ===
- Tysyn Hartman (1989– ), safety
- Tony Leiker (1964– ), defensive end

=== Baseball ===
- Otto Denning (1912–1992), catcher, first baseman, manager
- Dylan Dreiling (2003– ), outfielder and 2024 College World Series Most Outstanding Player
- Elon Hogsett (1903–2001), pitcher
- Willard Schmidt (1928–2007), pitcher

=== Basketball ===
- Ron Baker (1993– ), shooting guard with the New York Knicks (born in Hays, but grew up in Utica and Scott City)
- Marlies Gipson (1987– ), forward

=== Other ===
- Dave Armstrong (1957– ), announcer
- Bob Davis (1945– ), sportscaster

== See also ==
- List of people from Ellis County, Kansas
- List of Fort Hays State University people
- Lists of people from Kansas
