= List of people from Shawnee, Kansas =

This article is a list of notable individuals who were born in and/or have lived in Shawnee, Kansas.

== Arts and entertainment ==
- Danni Boatwright, winner of Survivor: Guatemala
- Sukhdarshan Dhaliwal (1950–2015), poet
- Ken Ferguson (1928–2004), ceramist
- Chris Porter (born 1979), comedian

== Business ==
- Linda Cook (born 1958), energy industry executive

== Politics ==
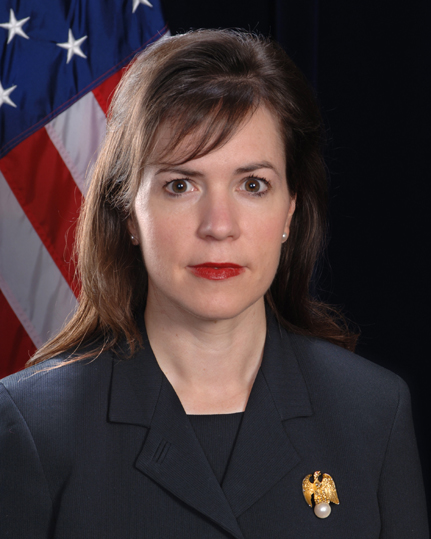
Julie Myers

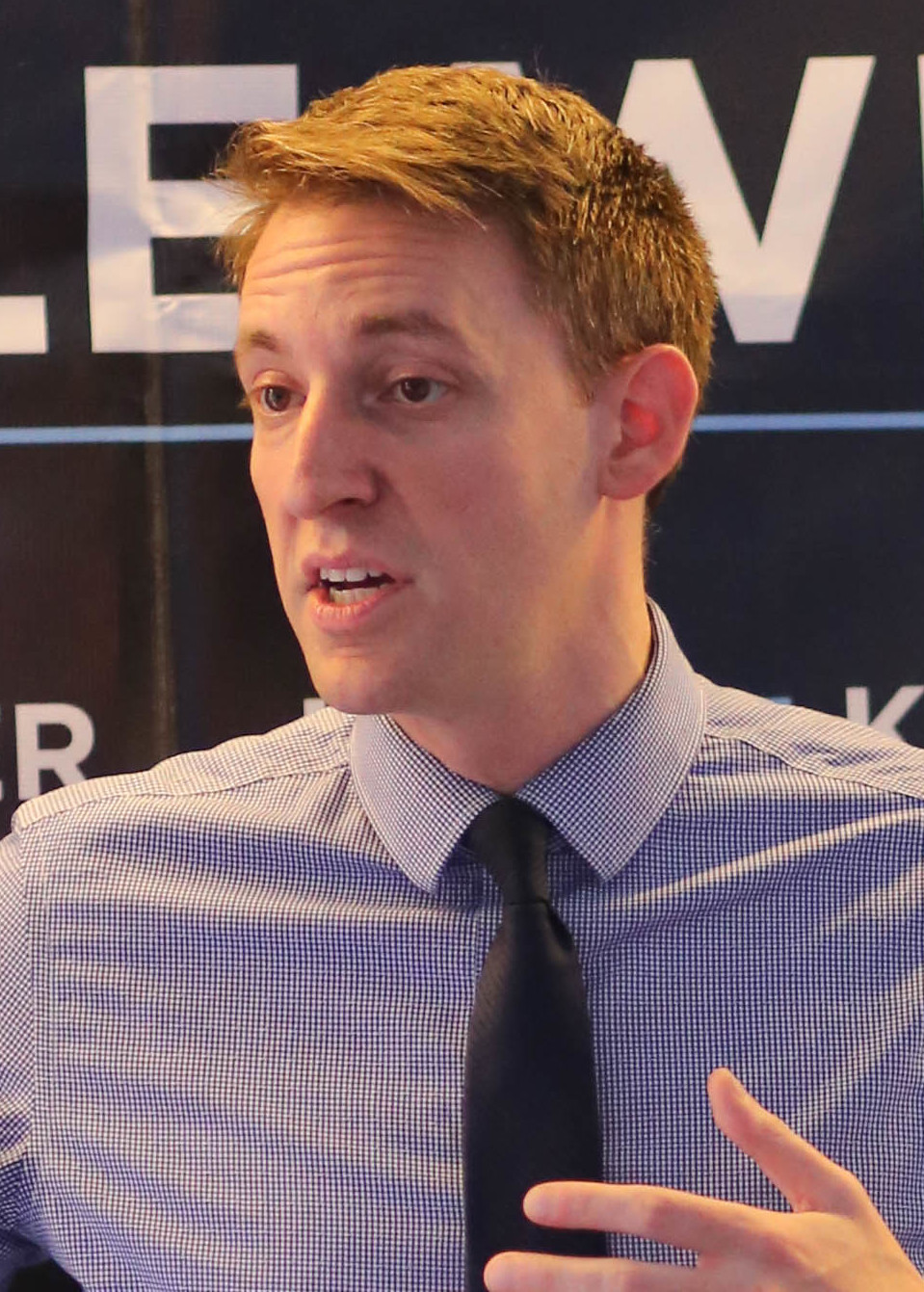
Jason Kander

=== National ===
- Julie Myers (born 1969), Assistant Secretary of Homeland Security for Immigration and Customs Enforcement

=== State ===
- Charles H. Akers (1857–1924), Secretary of Arizona Territory
- Nick Jordan (born 1949), Kansas state legislator, Secretary of Revenue
- Jason Kander (born 1981), Missouri Secretary of State
- Phill Kline (born 1959), Attorney General of Kansas, Kansas state legislator
- Mary Pilcher-Cook (born 1954), Kansas state legislator
- John Rubin (born 1948), Kansas state legislator
- Shawn Womack (born 1972), Arkansas judge and state legislator

== Sports ==
- Jeff Andra (born 1975), baseball pitcher
- Coady Andrews (born 1989), soccer player
- Johnny Carver (born 1995), sports author
- Dave Doeren (born 1971), football head coach, North Carolina State
- Bryan Goebel (born 1961), professional bowler
- Bob Grim (1930–1996), baseball pitcher; lived and died in Shawnee
- Ed Hearn (born 1960), baseball catcher
- Brian Smith (born 1989), football linebacker
- Ryan Torain (born 1986), football running back
- Keaton Wagler (born 2007), basketball player
- Sean Wheelock, Bellator MMA television commentator
- Gary Woodland (born 1984), professional golfer

== See also ==
- Lists of people from Kansas
- List of people from Johnson County, Kansas
