= List of people from Pittsburg, Kansas =

This article is a list of notable individuals who were born in or have lived in Pittsburg, Kansas.

== Academia ==
- Dale R. Corson (1914–2012), physicist
- Samuel Martin (1924–2009), linguist
- Vance Randolph (1892–1980), folklorist

== Arts and entertainment ==
=== Film, television, and theatre ===
- Hugh Gillin (1925–2004), actor
- Roy Glenn (1914–1971), actor
- Marlin Perkins (1905-1986) Zoologist, longtime host of TV's Mutual of Omaha's Wild Kingdom

=== Journalism ===
- Rick Atkinson (1952– ), newspaper journalist, military historian
- Paul White (1902–1955), broadcast journalist
- Brian Williams (1959– ), news anchor

=== Literature ===
- Harold Bell Wright (1872–1944), essayist, novelist, playwright
- Gary Zukav (1942– ), spiritualist, self-help writer

=== Music ===
- Lee Allen (1927–1994), saxophonist

=== Other visual arts ===
- Waylande Gregory (1905–1971), sculptor
- Alan Larkin (1953– ), artist
- Russell Myers (1938– ), cartoonist
- Scot Sothern (1949– ), photographer
- John Tewell (1943–2025), photographer
- Ann Woodward (1915–1975), radio actress, showgirl, and socialite

== Business ==
- William N. Deramus III (1915–1989), railroad executive
- Alexander Howat (1876–1945), coal miner, trade union leader
- Kenneth A. Spencer (1902–1960), chemical entrepreneur

== Crime ==
- Paul Roland Jones, 20th-century American criminal associated with the Chicago Outfit.
- Dennis Rader (1945– ), serial killer

== Military ==
- Jack William Wintle (1908–1942), U.S. Navy lieutenant commander, Navy Cross recipient

== Politics ==
=== National ===
- Philip P. Campbell (1862–1941), U.S. representative from Kansas
- John C. Coughenour (1941– ), U.S. federal judge
- Ronald Earl Longstaff (1941– ), U.S. federal judge
- Edward White Patterson (1895–1940), U.S. representative from Kansas

=== State ===
- Donald L. Allegrucci (1936–2014), Kansas Supreme Court justice
- Terry Calloway (1954– ), Kansas state legislator
- Jacob LaTurner, Kansas state treasurer-designate
- Arthur C. Mellette (1842–1896), 1st governor of South Dakota
- Julie Menghini (1964– ), Kansas state legislator
- Robert H. Trent (1936–2012), Wyoming state legislator

== Religion ==
- Ronald Michael Gilmore (1942– ), Roman Catholic prelate

== Sports ==
=== American football ===
See also List of Pittsburg State Gorillas head football coaches

- Brad Franchione (1974– ), coach
- Dale Hall (1924–1996), coach
- Dylan Meier (1984–2010), quarterback
- Kerry Meier (1986– ), wide receiver
- Shad Meier (1978– ), tight end
- Steve Quinn (1946– ), center
- Kevin Verdugo (1968– ), coach

=== Baseball ===
- P. J. Forbes (1967– ), infielder
- Don Gutteridge (1912–2008), second and third baseman, coach, manager
- Ray Mueller (1912–1994), catcher
- Bill Russell (1948– ), shortstop, coach, manager
- Roy Sanders (1894–1963), pitcher

=== Other ===
- Ralph "Wild Red" Berry (1906–1973), pro wrestler
- Ed Nealy (1960– ), basketball forward

== See also ==
- Lists of people from Kansas
