= List of people from Leawood, Kansas =

This article is a list of notable individuals who were born in and/or have lived in Leawood, Kansas.

== Academia ==
- Jeffrey L. Fisher (1970– ), law professor, U.S. Supreme Court litigator

== Arts and entertainment ==
=== Film, television, and theatre ===
- Holley Fain (1981– ), actress
- Nancy Opel (1957– ), singer, actress
- Heidi Gardner (2019- ), comedian

=== Gaming ===
- Nick Plott (1984– ), eSports commentator
- Sean Plott (1986– ), pro StarCraft gamer, caster, webshow host

=== Literature ===
- Julie Garwood (1944–2023), novelist
- Candice Millard (1968– ), historian, journalist
- Doug Worgul (1953– ), novelist, non-fiction author

=== Music ===
- Jim Abel (1947– ), singer-songwriter
- Phil Keaggy (1951– ), guitarist, singer

== Business ==
- Min Kao (1949– ), co-founder of Garmin Corporation
- Joyce Clyde Hall (1891–1982), founder of Hallmark Cards

== Government ==
- Karen McCarthy (1947–2010), U.S. Representative from Missouri
- Larkin Walsh, Justice of the Kansas Supreme Court

== Sports ==
=== American football ===
- Trent Green (1970– ), quarterback
- Travis Kelce (1989– ), tight end
- Mark Vlasic (1963– ), quarterback

=== Baseball ===
- Joe Carter (1960– ), outfielder, first baseman
- Alex Gordon (1984 –), outfielder
- Mike Morin (1991– ), relief pitcher
- Dan Quisenberry (1953–1998), pitcher
- Kevin Seitzer (1962– ), third baseman, hitting coach

=== Soccer ===
- Jon Kempin (1993– ), goalkeeper
- Ryan Raybould (1983– ), midfielder, defender
- Seth Sinovic (1987– ), defender

=== Tennis ===
- Jennifer Hopkins (1981– ), tennis player
- Jack Sock (1992– ), tennis player

== See also ==
- List of people from Johnson County, Kansas
- Lists of people from Kansas
