= List of Kansas State Wildcats in the NFL draft =

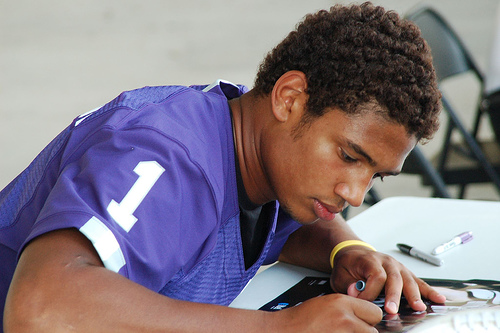
Josh Freeman was drafted 17th overall by the Tampa Bay Buccaneers in the 2009 NFL Draft.

This is a list of Kansas State Wildcats football players drafted into the National Football League (NFL) and American Football League (AFL). Kansas State has had a total of 158 players selected – including six players taken in the first round – from the first NFL draft in 1936 through the 2026 NFL draft. Kansas State had a streak of having at least one player drafted into the NFL for 26 consecutive years (1994–2019), until it ended in 2020.

After the NFL merged with the AFL in 1966, the history of the AFL was officially adopted by the NFL and therefore this list includes players taken in the AFL draft (1960–1966) and in the Common Draft (1967–1969) in addition to the NFL Draft. Once the AFL officially merged with the NFL in 1970, the "Common Draft" simply became the NFL Draft. Because four KSU players were selected in both the NFL and AFL drafts, the total number of selections listed below is 165 (including one "redshirt" selection in the 1965 AFL Draft), through the 2026 draft.

Each NFL franchise seeks to add new players through the annual NFL Draft. The draft rules were last updated in 2009. The team with the worst record the previous year picks first, the next-worst team second, and so on. Teams that did not make the playoffs are ordered by their regular-season record with any remaining ties broken by strength of schedule. Playoff participants are sequenced after non-playoff teams, based on their round of elimination (wild card, division, conference, and Super Bowl).

== Key ==
B	Back	K	Kicker	NT	Nose tackle
C	Center	LB	Linebacker	DB	Defensive back
P	Punter	HB	Halfback	DE	Defensive end
QB	Quarterback	WR	Wide receiver	DT	Defensive tackle
RB	Running back	G	Guard	E	End
T	Offensive tackle	TE	Tight end	FB	Fullback

*	Selected to a Pro Bowl
†	Won an NFL championship
‡	Selected to a Pro Bowl and won an NFL championship

== Selections ==
Terence Newman was drafted 5th overall by the Dallas Cowboys in the 2003 NFL Draft.

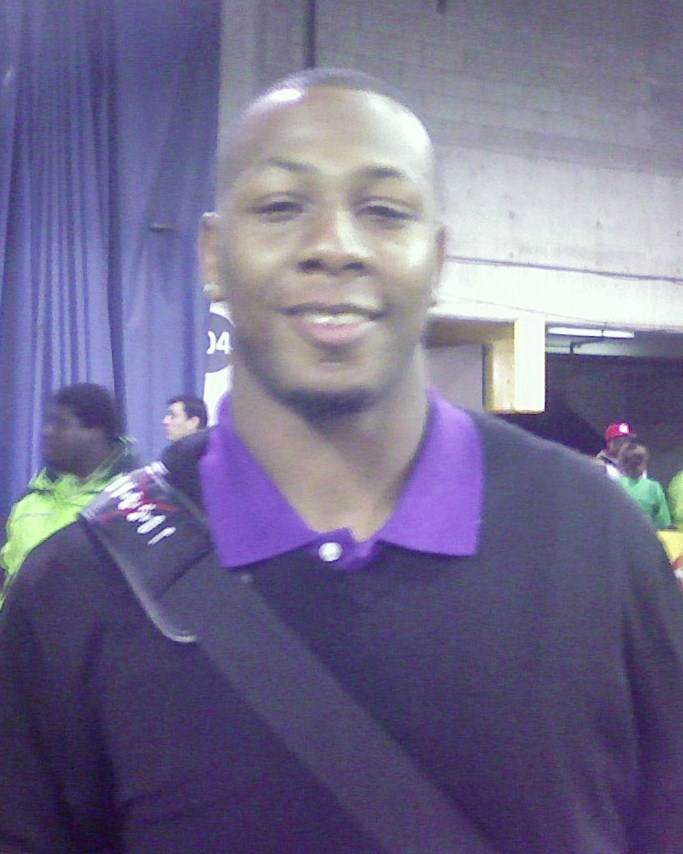
Michael Bishop was drafted in the 7th round by the New England Patriots in the 1999 NFL Draft.

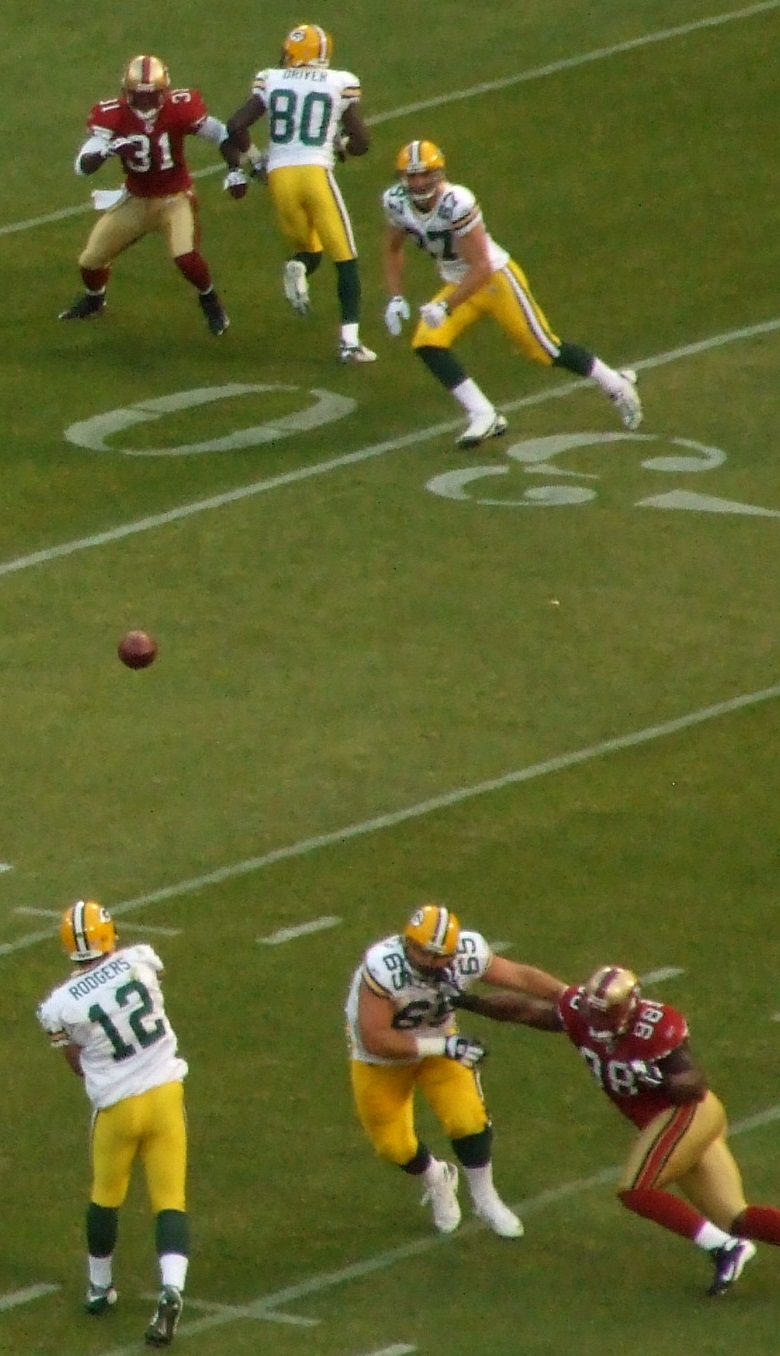
Jordy Nelson was drafted 36th overall by the Green Bay Packers in the 2008 NFL Draft.

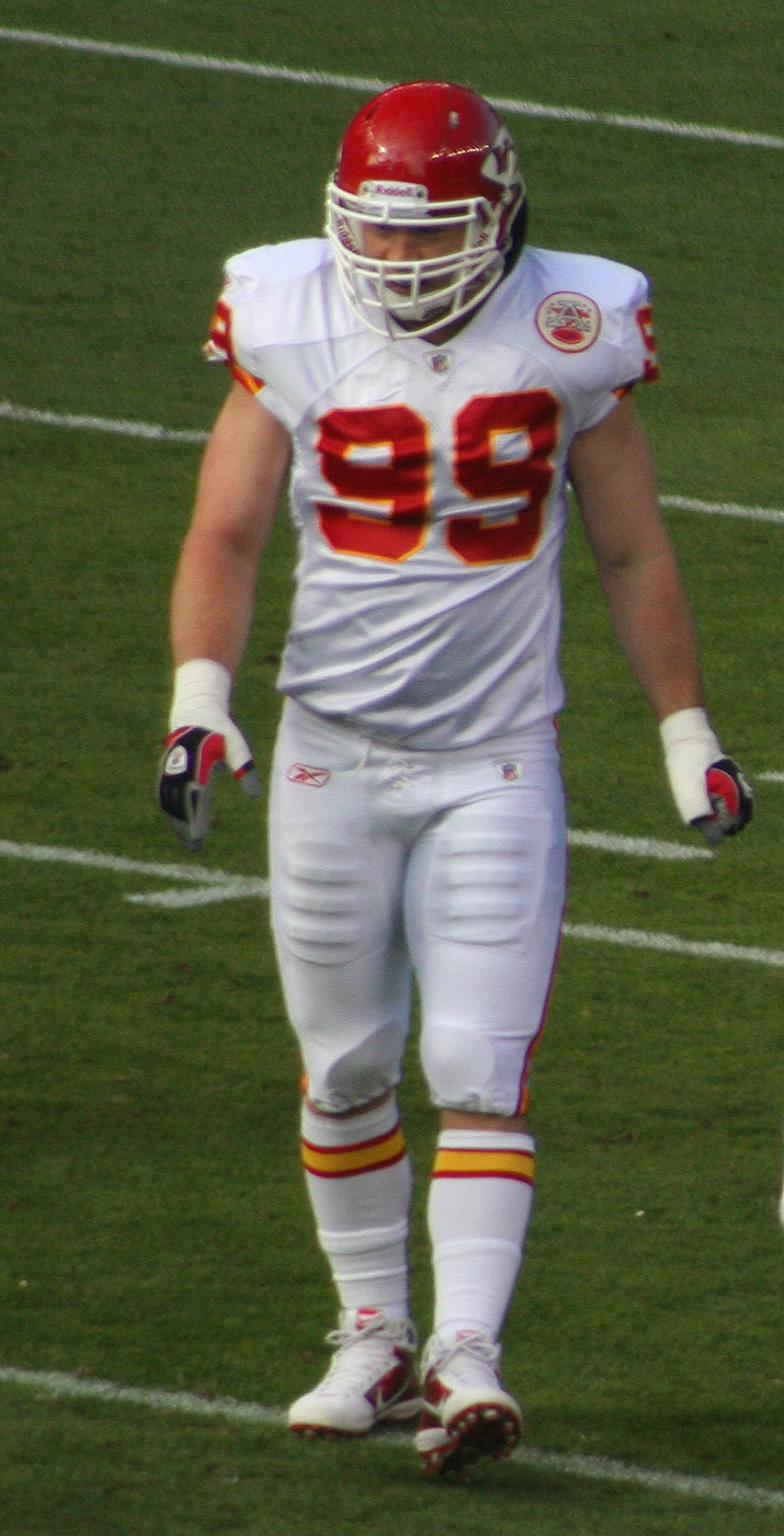
Mark Simoneau was selected by the Atlanta Falcons in 2000 NFL draft.

AFL Draft (1960–1966)
Year	Round	Pick	Overall	Player	Team	Position	Notes
1960	—	—	—	John Littlejohn	Buffalo Bills	B	also selected in NFL Draft
1960	—	—	—	Joe Vader	Dallas Texans	E	—
1961	6	1	41	Dale Evans	Denver Broncos	B	also selected in NFL Draft
1961	30	6	238	Cedric Price	Dallas Texans	E	—
1963	26	4	204	Willis Crenshaw	Buffalo Bills	B	also selected in NFL Draft
1965	7	4	52	Ron Barlow	New York Jets	FB	—
1966	9	1	74	Bill Matan	Miami Dolphins	E	also selected in NFL Draft

NFL Draft (1936–present)
Year	Round	Pick	Overall	Player	Team	Position	Notes
1937	3	6	26	Maurice Elder	Boston Redskins	B	starter on undefeated 1937 Los Angeles Bulldogs
1937	7	6	66	Rolla Holland	Boston Redskins	G	—
1937	9	1	81	Paul Fanning	Philadelphia Eagles	T	—
1940	11	2	92	Elmer Hackney	Philadelphia Eagles	RB	—
1940	15	2	142	Don Crumbaker	Philadelphia Eagles	E	—
1940	20	3	183	Bill Beezley	Philadelphia Eagles	T	—
1941	11	8	98	Bernie Weiner	Brooklyn Dodgers	T	—
1944	13	11	131	Mike Zeleznak	Boston Yanks	B	—
1944	24	8	249	Jack Bortka	Chicago Bears	B	—
1945	11	2	100	Earl Haury	Brooklyn Tigers	T	—
1945	16	2	155	Jim Ungles	Pittsburgh Steelers	B	—
1945	23	8	238	Mike Vargon	Chicago Bears	E	—
1946	31	5	295	Dale Cowan	Los Angeles Rams	T	—
1950	7	9	88	Rollin Prather	Chicago Bears	E	—
1953	13	7	152	Jack McShulski	New York Giants	E	—
1954	1	4	4	Veryl Switzer	Green Bay Packers	B	—
1955	2	6	19	Corky Taylor	Los Angeles Rams	B	—
1955	7	7	80	Ron Marciniak	Washington Redskins	G	—
1955	19	12	229	Tom Ebert	Cleveland Browns	E	—
1955	25	9	298	Dewey Wade	San Francisco 49ers	E	—
1956	7	8	81	Ron Nery	New York Giants	T	AFL All-Pro (1961)
1956	13	12	157	Jim Furey	Cleveland Browns	C	—
1956	26	5	306	Chuck Zickefoose	Chicago Cardinals	E	—
1956	29	6	343	Jim Rusher	Baltimore Colts	E	—
1958	7	10	83	Ralph Pfeifer	Detroit Lions	B	—
1958	9	1	98	John Keelan	Chicago Cardinals	T	—
1958	19	6	223	Gene Keady	Pittsburgh Steelers	B	—
1958	30	9	358	Ted Stahura	San Francisco 49ers	T	—
1959	29	3	339	John Stolte	Philadelphia Eagles	T	—
1960	16	5	185	John Littlejohn	Green Bay Packers	B	—
1961	6	8	78	Dale Evans	St. Louis Cardinals	B	—
1963	9	2	114	Willis Crenshaw	St. Louis Cardinals	B	—
1964	17	5	229	Joe Provenzano	Detroit Lions	T	—
1965	16	4	214	Doug Dusenbury	Pittsburgh Steelers	K	—
1965	20	5	271	Don Barlow	Dallas Cowboys	T	—
1966	8	8	118	Bill Matan	New York Giants	WR	—
1966	18	11	271	Willie Jones	St. Louis Cardinals	DT	—
1968	16	13	421	Dan Lankas	St. Louis Cardinals	LB	—
1969	5	17	121	Cornelius Davis	Minnesota Vikings	RB	—
1969	8	9	191	Larry Brown*	Washington Redskins	RB	NFL MVP (1972); Pro Bowl (1969, 70, 71, 72); Washington Redskins Ring of Fame
1969	11	14	280	Dave Jones	Washington Redskins	WR	—
1969	15	14	378	Bob Coble	Chicago Bears	P	—
1970	4	1	79	Lynn Larson	Chicago Bears	T	—
1970	6	2	132	Manuel Barrera	Pittsburgh Steelers	LB	—
1970	6	13	143	Mack Herron	Atlanta Falcons	RB	—
1970	8	8	190	Ira Gordon	Philadelphia Eagles	T	—
1970	12	6	292	Charles Collins	St. Louis Cardinals	WR	—
1970	16	26	416	Randy Ross	Kansas City Chiefs	LB	—
1971	1	14	14	Clarence Scott*	Cleveland Browns	DB	Pro Bowl (1973)
1971	3	4	56	Lynn Dickey	Houston Oilers	QB	Green Bay Packers Hall of Fame
1971	3	13	65	Mike Montgomery	San Diego Chargers	RB	—
1971	5	10	114	Dean Shaternick	San Francisco 49ers	T	—
1971	7	22	178	Ron Dickerson	Miami Dolphins	DB	—
1971	8	17	199	Ron Yankowski	St. Louis Cardinals	RB	—
1971	13	19	331	Russell Harrison	Los Angeles Rams	RB	—
1972	5	7	111	Bill Butler	New Orleans Saints	RB	—
1972	7	3	159	Joe Colquitt	Pittsburgh Steelers	DE	—
1972	8	12	194	Marion Lattimore	New York Jets	G	—
1972	8	13	195	Steve Beyrle	New England Patriots	G	—
1972	11	2	262	John Robertson	New York Giants	DB	—
1973	13	25	336	Rick Fergerson	Pittsburgh Steelers	WR	—
1973	14	19	357	Dennis Morrison	San Francisco 49ers	QB	—
1974	5	5	109	Henry Childs*	Atlanta Falcons	TE	Pro Bowl (1979); New Orleans Saints Hall of Fame
1974	7	10	167	Willie Cullars	Philadelphia Eagles	DE	—
1974	10	14	249	Don Calhoun	Buffalo Bills	RB	—
1974	11	10	271	Bill Brittain	Philadelphia Eagles	C	—
1974	13	12	325	Fred Rothwell	Detroit Lions	C	—
1974	15	12	377	John Wells	Detroit Lions	G	—
1974	15	20	385	Isaac Jackson	Cincinnati Bengals	RB	—
1975	5	12	116	Steve Grogan	New England Patriots	QB	—
1975	16	10	401	John Tuttle	Cincinnati Bengals	WR	—
1975	16	15	406	Les Chaves	Detroit Lions	DB	—
1978	3	2	58	Gary Spani	Kansas City Chiefs	LB	Kansas City Chiefs Hall of Fame
1979	5	6	116	Dan Manucci	Buffalo Bills	QB	—
1979	12	3	306	Charlie Green	Baltimore Colts	WR	—
1980	11	3	280	Eddy Whitley	Baltimore Colts	TE	—
1981	5	19	130	Stevan Clark	New England Patriots	DT	—
1982	3	11	66	Eugene Goodlow	New Orleans Saints	WR	CFL All Star (1981)
1986	10	28	277	Barton Hundley	Chicago Bears	DB	—
1986	11	12	289	Tim Stone	Cincinnati Bengals	T	—
1988	5	23	132	Tony Jordan	Phoenix Cardinals	RB	—
1990	6	10	147	Maurice Henry	Detroit Lions	LB	—
1992	5	6	118	Rogerick Green	Tampa Bay Buccaneers	DB	—
1992	7	11	179	Russ Campbell	Pittsburgh Steelers	TE	—
1992	10	2	254	Elijah Alexander	Tampa Bay Buccaneers	LB	—
1994	2	18	47	Thomas Randolph	New York Giants	DB	—
1994	3		70	Andre Coleman	San Diego Chargers	WR	—
1995	2	26	58	Barrett Brooks^{†}	Philadelphia Eagles	T	Super Bowl Champion (XL)
1995	4	13	111	Chad May	Minnesota Vikings	QB	—
1996	4	10	105	Percell Gaskins	St. Louis Rams	LB	—
1997	1	29	29	Chris Canty	New England Patriots	DB	—
1997	2	17	47	Kevin Lockett	Kansas City Chiefs	WR	—
1998	2	17	47	Todd Weiner	Seattle Seahawks	T	—
1999	3	29	80	Martín Gramática^{‡}	Tampa Bay Buccaneers	K	Pro Bowl (2000); Super Bowl Champion (XXXVII)
1999	6	29	198	Jeff Kelly	Atlanta Falcons	LB	—
1999	7	17	223	Ryan Young	New York Jets	T	—
1999	7	21	227	Michael Bishop	New England Patriots	QB	—
1999	7	30	238	Justin Swift	Denver Broncos	TE	—
1999	7	34	240	Darnell McDonald	Tampa Bay Buccaneers	WR	—
2000	2	2	33	Darren Howard	New Orleans Saints	DE	—
2000	3	5	67	Mark Simoneau^{†}	Atlanta Falcons	LB	Super Bowl Champion (XLIV)
2000	3	21	83	Damion McIntosh	San Diego Chargers	T	—
2000	5	17	146	Lamar Chapman	Cleveland Browns	DB	—
2000	6	4	170	Frank Murphy	Chicago Bears	RB	—
2001	2	2	33	Quincy Morgan^{†}	Cleveland Browns	WR	Super Bowl Champion (XL)
2001	3	28	90	Shad Meier	Tennessee Titans	TE	—
2001	4	11	107	Monty Beisel	Kansas City Chiefs	LB	—
2001	5	2	133	Mario Fatafehi	Arizona Cardinals	DT	—
2001	5	11	143	Jarrod Cooper	Carolina Panthers	DB	—
2001	5	12	145	Jerametrius Butler	St. Louis Rams	DB	—
2002	2	25	57	Jon McGraw	New York Jets	DB	—
2002	3	6	71	Ben Leber	San Diego Chargers	LB	—
2002	6	1	173	DeMarcus Faggins	Houston Texans	DB	—
2002	6	13	185	Josh Scobey	Arizona Cardinals	RB	UFL Champion (2009)
2002	7	43	254	Aaron Lockett	Tampa Bay Buccaneers	WR	—
2002	7	46	257	Rock Cartwright	Washington Redskins	RB	—
2003	1	5	5	Terence Newman*	Dallas Cowboys	DB	Pro Bowl (2007, 2009)
2003	2	19	51	Terry Pierce	Denver Broncos	LB	—
2003	5	20	155	Melvin Williams	New Orleans Saints	DE	—
2003	7	10	224	Taco Wallace	Seattle Seahawks	WR	—
2004	6	2	167	Nick Leckey^{†}	Arizona Cardinals	C	Super Bowl Champion (XLIV)
2004	7	3	236	Rashad Washington	New York Jets	DB	—
2005	4	29	130	Darren Sproles^{‡}	San Diego Chargers	RB	Super Bowl Champion (LII); Pro Bowl (2014, 2015)
2006	6	18	187	Jeromey Clary	San Diego Chargers	T	—
2007	3	10	74	Yamon Figurs	Baltimore Ravens	WR	—
2007	6	12	186	Thomas Clayton	San Francisco 49ers	RB	—
2007	7	8	218	Zac Diles	Houston Texans	LB	—
2008	2	5	36	Jordy Nelson^{‡}	Green Bay Packers	WR	Super Bowl Champion (XLV); Pro Bowl (2015)
2008	7	39	242	Rob Jackson	Washington Redskins	DE	—
2009	1	17	17	Josh Freeman	Tampa Bay Buccaneers	QB	—
2010	5	10	141	Josh Moore	Chicago Bears	DB	—
2011	2	30	62	Daniel Thomas	Miami Dolphins	RB	—
2012	7	22	229	Bryce Brown	Philadelphia Eagles	RB	—
2013	2	24	56	Arthur Brown	Baltimore Ravens	LB	—
2013	4	25	123	Chris Harper	Seattle Seahawks	WR	—
2013	6	35	204	Braden Wilson	Kansas City Chiefs	FB	—
2014	6	26	202	Tavon Rooks	New Orleans Saints	T	—
2015	3	5	69	Tyler Lockett*	Seattle Seahawks	WR	Pro Bowl (2016); NFL All-Pro (2015)
2015	6	20	196	Randall Evans	Philadelphia Eagles	DB	—
2016	2	25	56	Cody Whitehair*	Chicago Bears	C	Pro Bowl (2019)
2017	3	9	73	Jordan Willis	Cincinnati Bengals	DE	—
2017	7	14	232	Elijah Lee	Minnesota Vikings	LB	—
2018	5	5	142	D. J. Reed	San Francisco 49ers	DB	—
2019	2	9	41	Dalton Risner	Denver Broncos	T	—
2019	6	32	205	Duke Shelley	Chicago Bears	DB	—
2021	7	7	235	Wyatt Hubert	Cincinnati Bengals	DE	—
2022	7	26	247	Skylar Thompson	Miami Dolphins	QB	—
2022	7	32	253	Russ Yeast	Los Angeles Rams	DB	—
2023	1	31	31	Felix Anudike-Uzomah^{†}	Kansas City Chiefs	DE	Super Bowl Champion (LVII)
2023	2	13	44	JuJu Brents	Indianapolis Colts	DB	—
2023	6	4	181	Josh Hayes	Tampa Bay Buccaneers	DB	—
2023	6	35	212	Deuce Vaughn	Dallas Cowboys	RB	—
2024	2	21	53	Ben Sinnott	Washington Commanders	TE	—
2024	3	9	73	Cooper Beebe	Dallas Cowboys	G	—
2024	7	34	254	KT Leveston	Los Angeles Rams	G	—
2025	3	20	84	Jacob Parrish	Tampa Bay Buccaneers	CB	—
2025	5	14	151	DJ Giddens	Indianapolis Colts	RB	—
2025	5	24	160	Marques Sigle	San Francisco 49ers	S	—
2026	5	4	144	Sam Hecht	Carolina Panthers	C	—
2026	7	12	228	VJ Payne	New York Jets	S	—

== Notable undrafted players ==
Note: No drafts held before 1920

Debut year	Player name	Debut NFL/AFL team	Position	Notes
1929	Bert Pearson	Chicago Bears	C	—
1934	Doug Russell	Chicago Cardinals	B	—
1968	Art Strozier	San Diego Chargers	TE	—
1972	Keith Best	Kansas City Chiefs	LB	—
1978	Paul Coffman	Green Bay Packers	TE	—
1978	Mike Osborn	Philadelphia Eagles	LB	—
1978	Marvin Switzer	Buffalo Bills	DB	—
1980	M. L. Harris	Cincinnati Bengals	TE	—
1981	Monte Bennett	New Orleans Saints	DT	—
1981	Greg Brown	Philadelphia Eagles	DT	—
1982	James Walker	New Orleans Saints	LB	—
1983	Greg Best	Pittsburgh Steelers	S	—
1983	Jim Bob Morris	Kansas City Chiefs	S	—
1985	Eric Bailey	Atlanta Falcons	TE	—
1985	Scott Fulhage	Buffalo Bills	P	—
1986	Gerald Alphin	Los Angeles Raiders	WR	—
1986	Damian Johnson	New York Giants	G	—
1986	Jack Epps	Kansas City Chiefs	S	—
1987	Will Cokeley	Buffalo Bills	LB	—
1987	Doug Hoppock	Kansas City Chiefs	T	—
1987	Jeff Hurd	Dallas Cowboys	LB	—
1992	Michael Smith	Kansas City Chiefs	WR	—
1994	Quentin Neujahr	Los Angeles Raiders	C	—
1996	Tim Colston	Buffalo Bills	NT	—
1997	Jason Johnson	Indianapolis Colts	C	—
1998	Kendyl Jacox	San Diego Chargers	G	—
2001	David Allen	San Francisco 49ers	RB	—
2001	Jonathan Beasley	Green Bay Packers	QB	—
2001	Dyshod Carter	Kansas City Chiefs	CB	—
2002	Matt Martin	Tennessee Titans	G	—
2003	Allen Reese	Kansas City Chiefs	DT	—
2004	Ryan Lilja	Indianapolis Colts	G	—
2004	Andrew Shull	Detroit Lions	DE	—
2005	Kevin Huntley	Oakland Raiders	DT	—
2007	Brandon Archer	Indianapolis Colts	LB	—
2008	James Johnson	Cincinnati Bengals	RB	—
2009	Ian Campbell	St. Louis Rams	DE	—
2009	Reggie Walker	Arizona Cardinals	LB	—
2010	Brandon Banks	Washington Redskins	WR	—
2010	Jeron Mastrud	Tampa Bay Buccaneers	TE	—
2012	Tysyn Hartman	Kansas City Chiefs	S	—
2013	Justin Tuggle	Houston Texans	LB	—
2013	Meshak Williams	Baltimore Ravens	DE	—
2014	Cornelius Lucas	Detroit Lions	T	—
2015	B. J. Finney	Pittsburgh Steelers	C	—
2015	Ryan Mueller	San Diego Chargers	DE	—
2015	Jake Waters	Seattle Seahawks	QB	—
2018	Matt McCrane	Arizona Cardinals	K	—
2018	Byron Pringle	Kansas City Chiefs	WR	—
2021	A. J. Parker	Detroit Lions	CB	—
2022	Timmy Horne	Atlanta Falcons	NT	—
2023	Ekow Boye-Doe	Kansas City Chiefs	CB	—
2024	Adrian Martinez	New York Jets	QB	—
2026	Jerand Bradley	Los Angeles Chargers	WR	—
2026	Uso Seumalo	Seattle Seahawks	NT	—

Nine KSU players were selected by other leagues directly challenging the NFL: two were drafted in the 1948 All-America Football Conference draft (Rollin Prather and Mike Zeleznek), two were selected in the 1983 USFL draft (Amos Donaldson and Will Cokeley), three were selected in the 1984 USFL draft (Reggie Singletary, L. E. Madison and Eric Mack), and two more in the 1985 USFL draft (Eric Bailey and Kyle Clawson). Many of these players also played in the NFL.

== See also ==
- List of Kansas State University people
