= List of people from Junction City, Kansas =

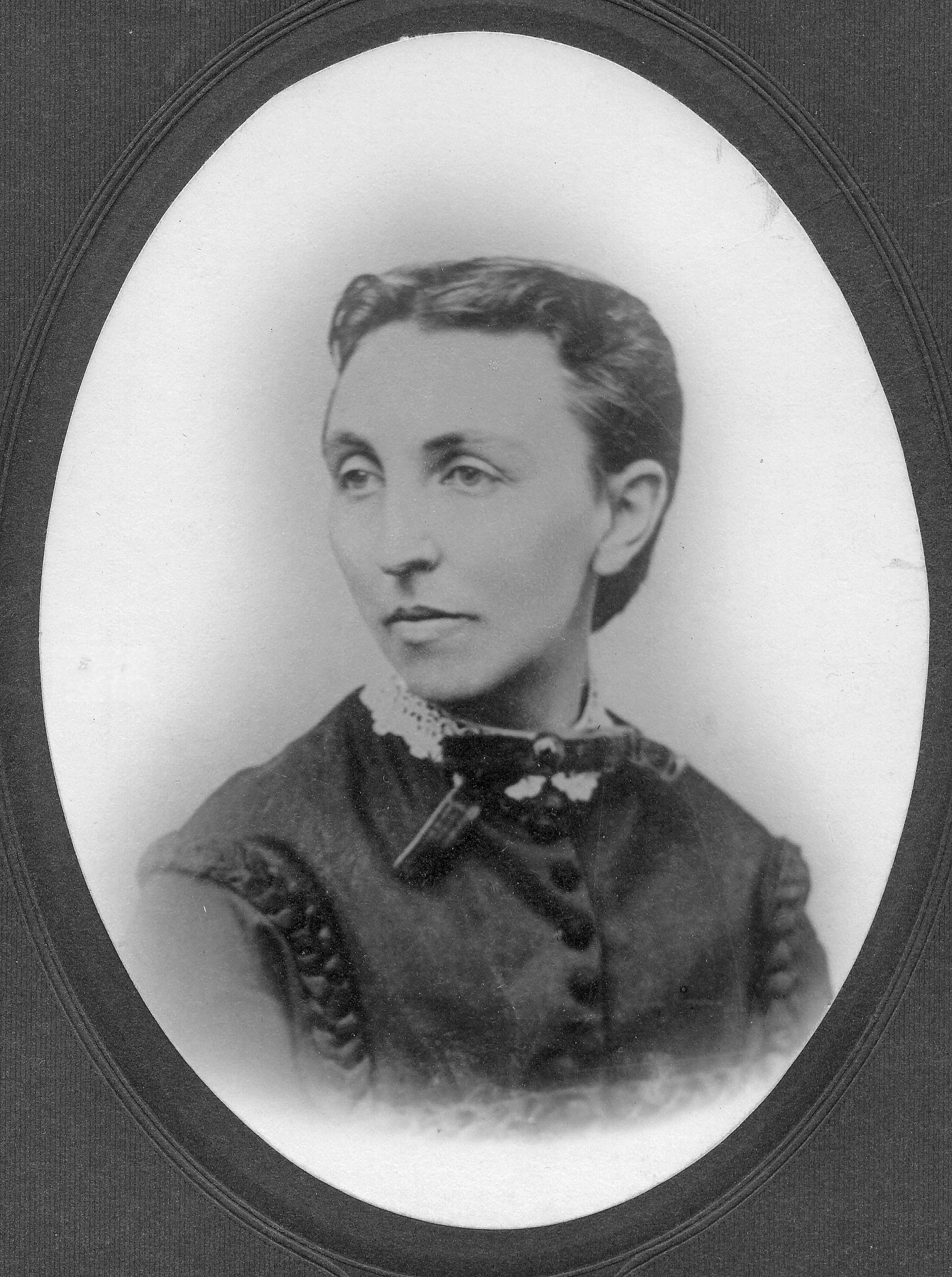
Amanda Jones invented the process of vacuum canning for food preservation and held multiple patents.

This article is a list of notable individuals who were born in and/or have lived in Junction City, Kansas.

== Arts and entertainment ==
=== Film, television, and theatre ===
- Iva Kitchell (1908–1983), comedian, dancer
- John Cameron Mitchell (1963– ), actor, playwright, screenwriter, director
- Rockne Tarkington (1931–2015), actor
- Kevin Willmott (1959– ), film director, screenwriter

=== Journalism ===
- Peggy Hull (1889–1967), journalist

=== Literature ===
- Velina Hasu Houston (1957– ), playwright, poet, essayist
- Mary Vance Humphrey (1838-1916), writer, clubwoman

=== Music ===
- Marvin Ash (1914–1974), jazz pianist

=== Other visual arts ===
- Marion Manley (1893–1984), architect
- Fred Otnes (1925–2015), illustrator, painter
- Mary Rockwell Hook (1877–1978), architect
- Renee Stout (1958– ), assemblage artist

== Business ==
- Marillyn Hewson (1953– ), aerospace and defense executive
- Amanda Jones (1835–1914), entrepreneur, inventor

== Crime ==
=== Law enforcement ===
- Thomas A. Cullinan (1838–1904), city marshal, lawman

== Military ==
- John Byers Anderson (1817–1897), U.S. Army colonel, military superintendent of railroads
- Michael P. C. Carns (1937–2023), U.S. Air Force general
- Adna R. Chaffee, Jr. (1884–1941), U.S. Army major general
- Walter D. Ehlers (1921–2014), U.S. Army 2nd lieutenant, Medal of Honor recipient
- John C. H. Lee (1887–1958), U.S. Army lieutenant general
- John A. Seitz (1908–1987), U.S. Army brigadier general
- Richard J. Seitz (1918–2013), U.S. Army lieutenant general

== Politics ==
=== National ===
- John Alexander Anderson (1834–1892), U.S. representative from Kansas
- John Davis (1826–1901), U.S. representative from Kansas
- Dwight D. Eisenhower (1890–1969), 34th president of the United States, general of the Army

=== State ===
- Leslie A. Miller (1886–1970), 17th governor of Wyoming

== Sports ==
=== American football ===
- Mark Dennis (1965– ), offensive tackle
- Ron Prince (1969– ), coach

=== Baseball ===
- Joey Devine (1983– ), relief pitcher
- George Giles (1909–1992), first baseman
- Bob Horner (1957– ), first and third baseman
- John Wells (1922–1993), pitcher

=== Other ===
- Steve Henson (1968– ), basketball point guard, coach
- Bobby Lashley (1976– ), mixed martial artist, pro wrestler
- James C. Wofford (1944– ), equestrian
- Isiah Young (1990– ), U.S. Olympic track and field sprinter

== See also ==
- Lists of people from Kansas
