= List of people from Manhattan, Kansas =

This article is a list of notable people who were born in and/or have lived in Manhattan, Kansas. Alumni of local universities, including athletes and coaches, that are not originally from Manhattan should not be included in this list; instead, they should be listed in the alumni list article for each university.

== Academics ==
- Helen Brockman, fashion design professor
- Stephen S. Chang, food scientist
- May Louise Cowles, early advocate of teaching home economics
- Kenneth S. Davis, historian and university professor, most renowned for his series of biographies of Franklin Delano Roosevelt.
- Milton S. Eisenhower, former president of Kansas State University and brother to Dwight D. Eisenhower
- David Fairchild, botanist, explorer
- Philip Fox, astronomer
- Solon Toothaker Kimball, educator and anthropologist
- Jennifer Lippincott-Schwartz, cell biologist and neuroscientist
- Abby Lillian Marlatt, noted educator
- George A. Milliken, statistician
- Benjamin Franklin Mudge, geologist
- Merrill D. Peterson, historian
- Luraine Tansey, librarian who developed a universal slide classification scheme
- Virginia Trotter, education administrator
- Samuel Wendell Williston, scientist
- Robert A. Woodruff, space instrumentation scientist

== Arts and entertainment ==
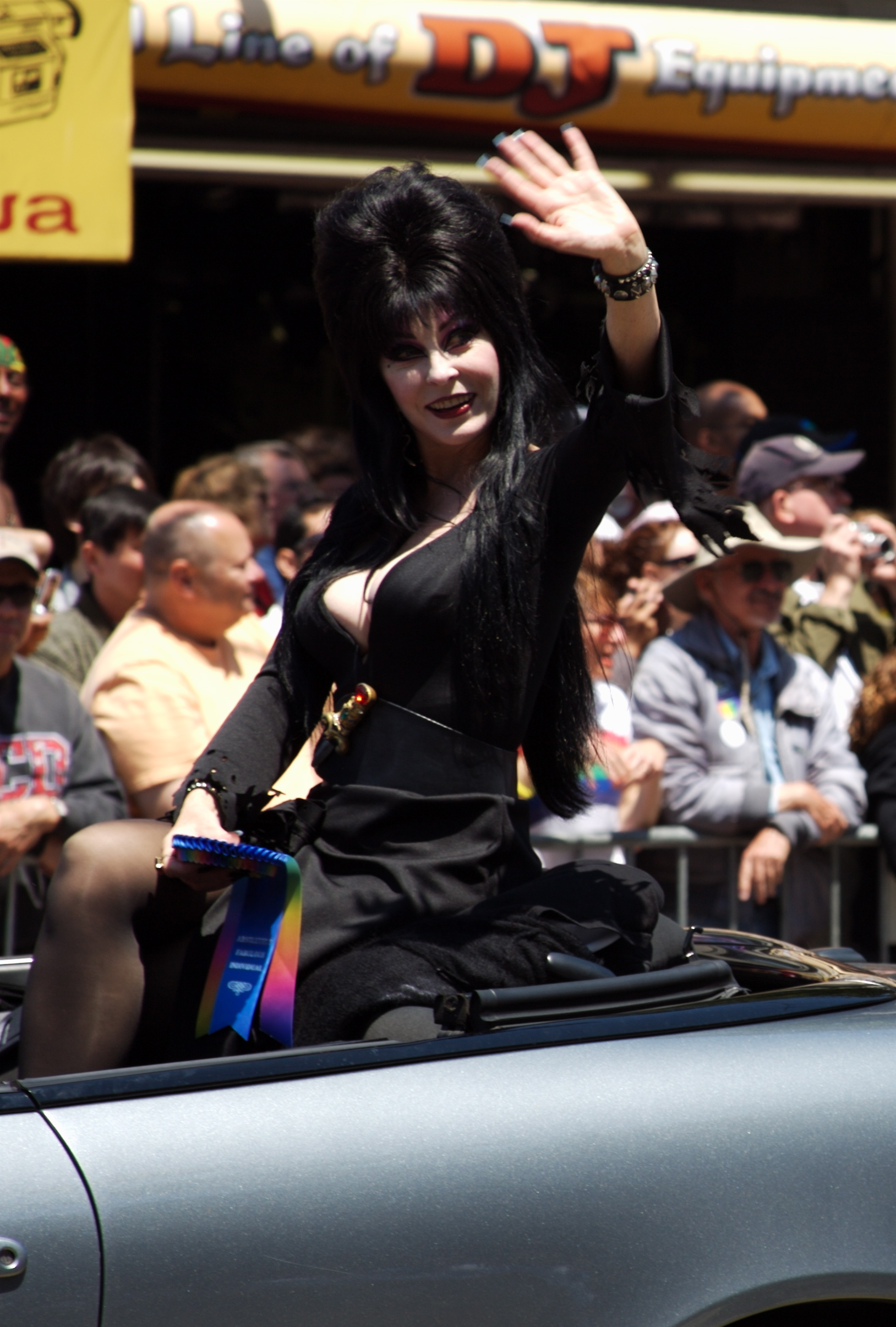
Cassandra Peterson, dressed as Elvira at the 2006 San Francisco Gay Pride parade

- Dawayne Bailey, composer, guitarist, and vocalist; formerly of Bob Seger's Silver Bullet Band and Chicago
- Bill Buzenberg, journalist, executive director of Center for Public Integrity, former vice-president of news at NPR
- Elizabeth Williams Champney, author
- Louis Chaudet, film director, writer
- Del Close, comedian
- Brian Doyle-Murray, actor, scriptwriter
- Bridget Everett, cabaret artist, comedian
- Jonathan Holden, first Poet Laureate of Kansas
- Lee Killough, author
- Charles Melton, actor and model
- Tom Oberheim, inventor of Oberheim synthesizer and DMX drum machine
- Mitsugi Ohno, glassblower
- Clementine Paddleford, food critic
- Cassandra Peterson, actress and model, best known as "Elvira, Mistress of the Dark"
- A.J. Rathbun, renowned mixologist
- Damon Runyon, author
- Inger Stevens, Swedish-American movie and TV actress
- Eric Stonestreet, actor, notable for his Emmy-winning role on the ABC comedy Modern Family
- Laura Zabel, arts advocate

== Athletics ==
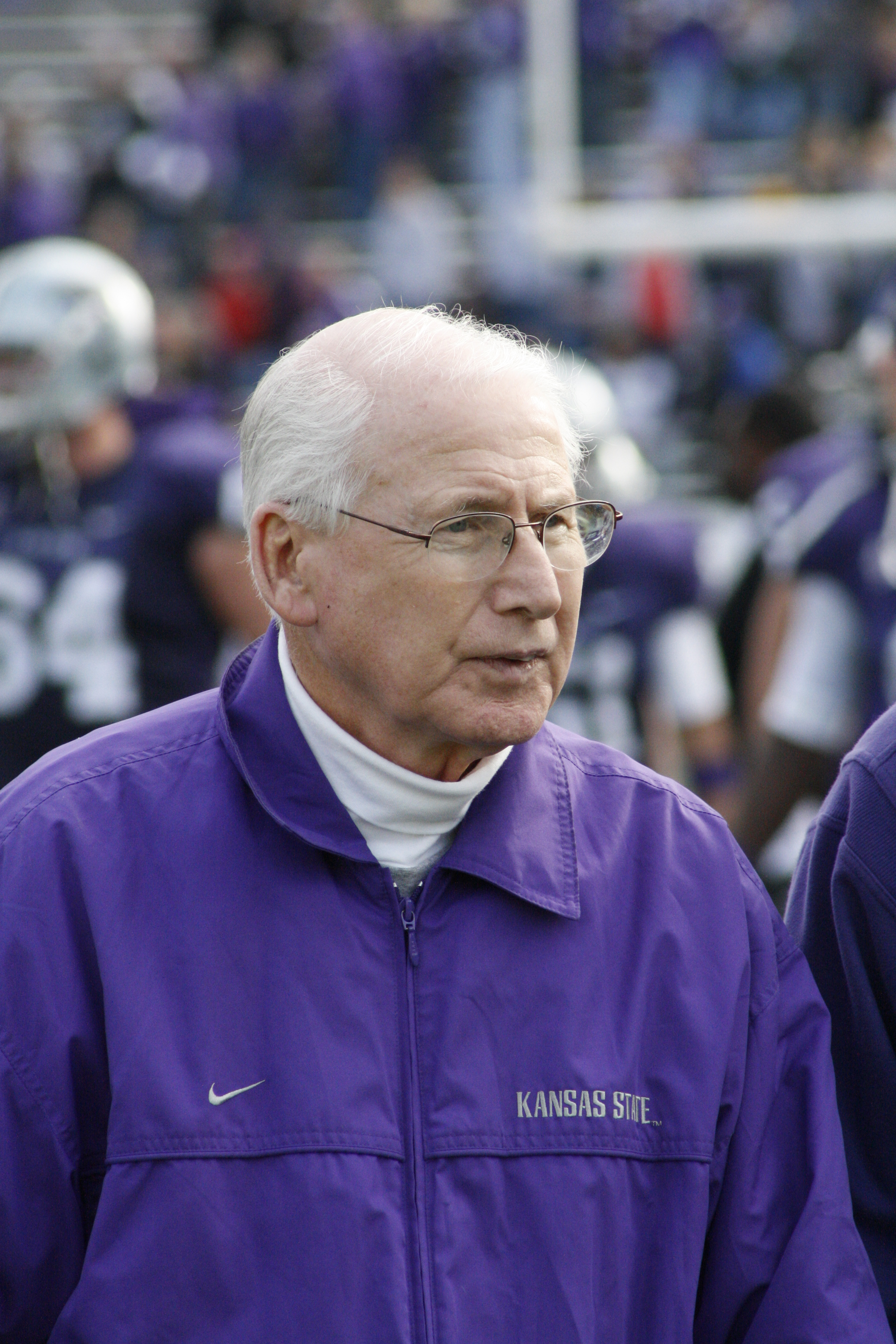
Bill Snyder, head football coach at Kansas State University

See also List of Kansas State Wildcats head football coaches and List of Kansas State Wildcats in the NFL draft

- Bob Anderson, founder of Runner's World
- Jeremy Bates, quarterback coach for the Chicago Bears
- Tom Brosius, track and field athlete
- Jackie Carmichael (born 1990), basketball player
- Jim Colbert, professional golfer
- Bobby Douglass, former National Football League player
- Brian Giles, former Major League Baseball player
- Larry Hartshorn, NFL player for the Chicago Cardinals
- Tim Jankovich, college basketball coach
- Lon Kruger, college and professional basketball coach
- Scott Liebler, former Atlantic Championship racing driver
- Jon McGraw, NFL player for the New York Jets
- Travis Metcalf, professional baseball player
- Jordy Nelson, NFL player for the Green Bay Packers
- Tim Norris, golf coach and former professional golfer
- Bert Pearson, NFL player for the Chicago Bears
- Vince Rafferty, NFL player
- Thomas Randolph, All-American football player
- Deb Richard, professional golfer
- Ann Roniger, American athlete, high jumper, pentathlete
- Bill Snyder, NCAA football head football coach at Kansas State University
- Gary Spani, Kansas City Chiefs franchise Hall of Fame

== Military ==
- John Byers Anderson, military officer, businessman, president of the First National Bank of Manhattan
- Frank Coe, major general in United States Army
- James Harbord, military officer, businessman
- Richard Jaccard, United States Navy pilot
- Earl Woods, father of Tiger Woods

== Politics ==
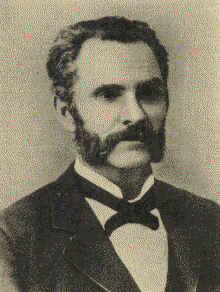
Nehemiah Green, fourth governor of Kansas

- John Alexander Anderson, U.S. Congressman
- John W. Carlin, 40th governor of Kansas
- Sydney Carlin, member of the Kansas House of Representatives
- Walter C. Dunton, member of the Kansas Territorial Legislature, Justice of the Vermont Supreme Court
- Joan Finney, 42nd governor of Kansas
- Nehemiah Green, 4th governor of Kansas
- Tom Hawk, member of the Kansas House of Representatives
- Martha Keys, U.S. Congressperson
- Albert E. Mead, 5th governor of Washington
- Jerry Moran, member of the United States Senate
- Frank B. Morrison, 34th governor of Nebraska
- Susan Mosier, member of the Kansas House of Representatives
- Tom Phillips, member of the Kansas House of Representatives
- Roger Reitz, member of the Kansas Senate
- Fred Andrew Seaton, Senator for Nebraska and Secretary of the Interior
- Walter J. Stoessel, diplomat

== Other ==
- Alice Stebbins Wells, first American-born policewoman in the U.S.

== See also ==
- List of Kansas State University people
- Lists of people from Kansas
