= List of people from Emporia, Kansas =

This article is a list of notable individuals who were born in and/or have lived in Emporia, Kansas.

== Academia ==
- Frank A. Beach (1911–1988), ethologist
- Richard Grant Hiskey (1929–2016), chemist
- Vernon Lyman Kellogg (1867–1937), entomologist, evolutionary biologist
- Samuel Martin (1924–2009), linguist
- Carl Salser (1921–2006), author, businessman, educator
- Arthur Samuel (1901–1990), computer scientist

== Arts and entertainment ==
=== Film, television, and theatre ===
- Harry Cheshire (1891–1968), actor
- R. Lee Ermey (1944–2018), former U.S. Marine drill instructor, television host, and actor
- Thelma Hill (1906–1938), silent-film comedian
- Q (1996 or 1997), drag performer competing on season 16 of RuPaul's Drag Race
- James Still (1959– ), playwright

=== Journalism ===
- William Allen White (1868–1944), author and newspaper editor
- William Lindsay White (1900–1973), author, newspaper editor, CBS war correspondent, Reader's Digest roving editor

=== Literature ===
- Jacob M. Appel (1973– ), novelist (Einstein's Beach House)
- Don Coldsmith (1926–2009), novelist
- Denise Low (1949– ), poet
- Keith Waldrop (1932–2023), poet, translator

=== Music ===
- Marvin Ash (1914–1974), jazz pianist
- Roy Burns (1935–2018), drummer
- Melora Creager (1966– ), cellist, singer-songwriter
- Cady Groves (1989–2020)
- Kelley Hunt, blues pianist, singer-songwriter
- Brian Leeds (1991–), electronic musician

=== Other visual arts ===
- Wendell Castle (1932–2018), furniture artist
- Evan Lindquist (1936–2023), artist, printmaker, Arkansas artist laureate
- Albert Murray (1906–1992), portrait painter
- Wilber Moore Stilwell (1908–1974), cartoonist, illustrator, painter

== Business ==
- David Green (1941– ), founder of Hobby Lobby
- George Webb Slaughter (1811–1895), cattle breeder and drover, Baptist minister

== Crime and law enforcement ==
- Mark Essex (1949–1973), mass murderer

== Military ==
- William F. Cloud (1825–1905), U.S. Army colonel
- Grant F. Timmerman (1919–1944), U.S. Marine Corps sergeant, Medal of Honor recipient

== Politics ==
=== National ===
- William Ripley Brown (1840–1916), U.S. representative from Kansas
- Rose Conway, personal secretary to President Harry S. Truman
- Elmer O. Leatherwood (1872–1929), U.S. representative from Utah
- Preston B. Plumb (1837–1891), U.S. senator from Kansas, co-founder of Emporia
- Edward Herbert Rees (1886–1969), U.S. representative from Kansas

=== State ===
- Jim Barnett (1955– ), Kansas state legislator
- Samuel J. Crawford (1835–1913), 3rd governor of Kansas
- Don Hill (1944– ), Kansas state legislator
- Jeff Longbine (1962– ), Kansas state legislator
- Peggy Mast (1948– ), Kansas state legislator
- Richard Proehl (1944– ), Kansas state legislator
- Roy Wilford Riegle (1896–1988), Kansas state legislator

== Religion ==
- Warren Parrish (1803–1877), early Mormon leader, Baptist minister

== Sports ==
- Clint Bowyer (1979– ), NASCAR driver
- Jim Everett (1963– ), quarterback
- Daniel Gallemore (1985– ), mixed martial artist
- J. L. Lewis (1960–2019), professional golfer
- John Lohmeyer (1951– ), defensive lineman
- Ray Pierce (1897–1963), baseball pitcher
- Paul Samson (1905–1982), U.S. Olympic swimmer, water polo player
- Dean Smith (1931–2015), former North Carolina basketball coach, member of College Basketball Hall of Fame

== See also ==
- Lists of people from Kansas
- List of people from Lyon County, Kansas
