= List of people from Great Bend, Kansas =

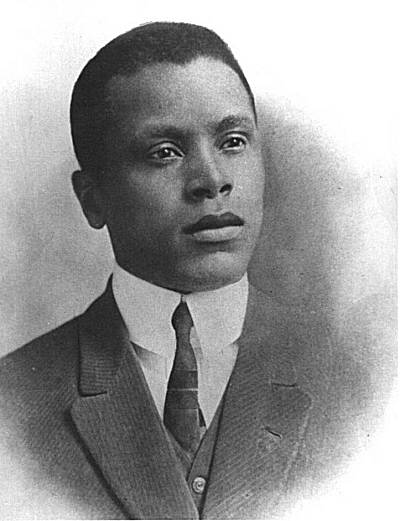
Oscar Micheaux is regarded as the first major African-American feature filmmaker and most successful African-American filmmaker of the first half of the twentieth century.

The following is a list of notable individuals who were born in and/or have lived in Great Bend, Kansas.

== Academia ==
- Joan Bondurant (1918–2006), political scientist, spy
- Jack Kilby (1923–2005), co-inventor of integrated circuit (IC), 2000 Nobel Prize laureate in physics
- Steve Kufeld (1939–1997), astronomer, inventor

== Arts and entertainment ==
- Karrin Allyson (1963– ), jazz singer, pianist
- Nicholas Barton (1983– ), filmmaker
- Bruce Helander (1947– ), artist
- Oscar Micheaux (1884–1951), author, film director
- Roy Stryker (1893–1975), photographer, economist

== Politics ==
- Jim Denning (1956–), majority leader of the Kansas Senate
- Joseph W. Henkle, Sr. (1906–1983), lieutenant governor of Kansas
- Roger Marshall (1960– ), U.S. representative from Kansas; U.S senator from Kansas
- Jerry Moran (1954– ), U.S. senator from Kansas

== Sports ==
=== American football ===
- Steve Crosby (1950– ), running back, coach
- Damian Johnson (1962– ), offensive lineman
- Monte Robbins (1964– ), punter

=== Baseball ===
- John R. Keennan (1940–2015), longtime baseball scout for the Los Angeles Dodgers club
- Ted Welch (1892–1943), pitcher

=== Other sports ===
- Steve Gotsche (1961– ), golfer
- John Keller (1928–2000), 1952 gold medal-winning U.S. Olympic basketball player

== See also ==
- Lists of people from Kansas
