= List of people from Leavenworth, Kansas =

This article is a list of notable individuals who were born in and/or have lived in Leavenworth, Kansas. For people whose only connection with the city is being incarcerated at one of the prisons in the city see List of inmates of United States Penitentiary, Leavenworth, United States Disciplinary Barracks#Notable inmates or Midwest Joint Regional Correctional Facility#Notable inmates, and for people whose only connection to the city is through the University of Saint Mary, see University of Saint Mary#Notable people.

== Academia ==
- R. H. Barlow (1918-1951), anthropologist, writer
- Francis Samuel Drake (1828-1885), historian.
- Malcolm MacVicar (1829-1904), educator
- Ernest Fox Nichols (1869-1924), physicist, president of Dartmouth College
- Robert A. Scalapino (1919-2011), political scientist
- Joseph Stayman (1817-1903), horticulturalist

== Arts and entertainment ==
=== Film, television, and theatre ===
- Hilda Clark (1872-1932), operetta soprano and model
- Buffalo Bill Cody (1846-1917), showman, frontiersman, scout
- Pat McMahon (born 1933), actor, disc jockey
- Fred Meyers (born 1983), actor
- Donn B. Murphy (1930–2022), president of the National Theatre, theatrical advisor to the President of the United States
- Brock Pemberton (1885-1950), theatrical director, producer, founder of the Tony Awards
- Theresa Vail (born 1990), television host, Miss Kansas 2013
- Richard Sanders actor, WKRP in Cincinnati

=== Journalism ===
- Fred Lockley (1871-1958), columnist
- James R. O'Neill (1833-1863), American Civil War correspondent and sketch artist
- Elizabeth Vargas (born 1962), television news anchor

=== Literature ===
- Yda Hillis Addis (born 1857), writer
- Harold Coyle (born 1952), novelist
- Bryan Penberthy (born 1976), poet

=== Music ===
- Charles N. Daniels (1878-1943), composer, music executive
- Melissa Etheridge (born 1961), singer-songwriter, guitarist
- Gary Foster (born 1936), multi-instrumentalist
- Randy Sparks (1933–2024), singer-songwriter
- J. White Did It (born 1984), record producer, songwriter, and DJ

=== Other visual arts ===
- Alfred Shea Addis (1832-1886), photographer
- William Pratt Feth (1866-1959), architect
- William Merrell Vories (1880-1964), architect, missionary

== Business ==
- Joseph W. Bettendorf (1864-1933), manufacturing executive
- Marie Guiraud (1830-1909), rancher
- Fred Harvey (1835–1901), restaurant entrepreneur
- Ron Logan (born 1938), business executive
- William Waddell (1807-1872), mail service entrepreneur, co-founder of the Pony Express
- Herbert M. Woolf (1880-1964), department store executive, racehorse owner

== Crime and law enforcement ==
- Thomas A. Cullinan (1838-1904), lawman
- Wild Bill Hickok (1837-1876), lawman, gunfighter
- George Henry Hoyt (1837-1877), lawman, Kansas Attorney General

== Military ==
- Donald Prentice Booth (1902-1993), U.S. Army Lieutenant General
- George P. Buell (1833-1883), U.S. Army Brevet Brigadier General, civil engineer
- Herbert B. Crosby (1871-1936), U.S. Army major general who served as the Chief of Cavalry
- John J. Davis (1909-1997), U.S. Army Lieutenant General
- Billy Dixon (1850-1913), scout, buffalo hunter
- Joseph K. Hudson (1840–1907), US Army brigadier general
- Charles R. Jennison (1834-1884), U.S. Army Colonel, abolitionist, Kansas state legislator
- Joseph E. Kuhn, commander of the 79th Division in World War I
- Daniel McCook, Jr. (1834-1864), U.S. Army Brigadier General
- David P. Muzzey (1838-1910), U.S. Army Lieutenant Colonel, lawyer
- Herman Poggemeyer Jr. (1919-2007), U.S. Marine Corps Major General
- David C. Schilling (1918-1956), U.S. Air Force Colonel, fighter ace
- Richard J. Seitz (1918-2013), U.S. Army Lieutenant General
- Persifor Frazer Smith (1798-1858), U.S. Army Brevet Brigadier General, Military Governor of California

== Politics ==
=== National ===
- Daniel Read Anthony (1824–1904), abolitionist, publisher
- Lucien Baker (1846–1907), U.S. Senator from Kansas
- Lloyd Llewellyn Black (1889–1950), U.S. federal judge
- William Patterson Borland (1867–1919), U.S. Representative from Missouri
- William M. Boyle (1902–1961), Democratic Party activist
- David Josiah Brewer (1837–1910), U.S. Supreme Court justice
- Alexander Caldwell (1830–1917), U.S. Senator from Kansas
- Robert Crozier (1827–1895), U.S. Senator from Kansas
- Mark W. Delahay (1828–1879), U.S. federal judge
- Dwight D. Eisenhower (1890–1969), 34th President of the United States, General of the Army
- Hugh Boyle Ewing (1826–1905), U.S. Ambassador to the Netherlands, U.S. Army Brevet Major General
- Thomas Ewing, Jr. (1829–1896), U.S. Representative from Ohio
- Thomas Ewing III (1862–1942), Commissioner of the U.S. Patent Office
- Benjamin Joseph Franklin (1839–1898), U.S. Representative from Missouri
- William Cather Hook (1857–1921), U.S. federal judge
- Edward Jacobson (1891–1955), business associate of Harry Truman, advocate for the creation of Israel
- Doug Lamborn (born 1954), U.S. Representative from Colorado
- Charles Henry Langston (1817–1892), abolitionist, political activist
- Cornelius Ambrose Logan (1832–1899), U.S. Ambassador to Chile, physician, writer
- Walter Nelles (1883–1937), lawyer, pacifist, co-founder of National Civil Liberties Bureau
- Marcus Junius Parrott (1828–1879), Kansas Territory delegate to U.S. Congress
- Hiram Rhodes Revels (1827–1901), U.S. Senator from Mississippi
- James B. Rhoads (1928–2015), 5th Archivist of the United States
- Edward T. Taylor (1858–1941), U.S. Representative from Colorado
- Donald S. Voorhees (1916–1989), U.S. federal judge
- Lewis Ledyard Weld (1833–1865), Colorado politician
- Abel Carter Wilder (1828–1875), U.S. Representative from Kansas
- Robert Patterson Clark Wilson (1834–1916), U.S. Representative from Missouri

=== State ===
- George T. Anthony (1824–1896), 7th Governor of Kansas
- Cassius McDonald Barnes (1845–1925), 4th Governor of Oklahoma Territory
- William A. Barstow (1813–1865), 3rd Governor of Wisconsin, U.S. Army Brigadier General
- H.S. Broiles (1845–1913), 6th Mayor of Fort Worth, Texas
- John A. Burns (1909–1975), 2nd Governor of Hawaii
- Thomas Carney (1824–1888), 2nd Governor of Kansas
- Powell Clayton (1833–1914), 9th Governor of Arkansas, U.S. Senator from Arkansas
- Robert E. Davis (1939–2010), Kansas Supreme Court Chief Justice
- Hiram Griswold (1807–1881), member of the Ohio Senate and defense lawyer of John Brown
- William Larimer, Jr. (1809–1875), Kansas state legislator, founder of Denver, Colorado
- Andrew Nisbet, Jr. (1921–2013), Washington state legislator
- Edward Stillings (1823–1890), Kansas state legislator, judge
- Samuel Hanson Stone (1849–1909), Kentucky politician

== Religion ==
- Sherwood Eddy (1871–1963), evangelist, missionary
- Louis Mary Fink (1834–1904), Roman Catholic Church prelate
- Isidor Kalisch (1816–1886), rabbi, writer.
- Michaelis Machol (1845–1912), rabbi
- John Baptist Miège (1815–1884), Roman Catholic Church missionary
- Paul Clarence Schulte (1890–1984), Roman Catholic Church prelate
- Winfield Scott (1837–1910), Baptist minister
- John Ward (1857–1929), Roman Catholic Church prelate

== Sports ==
=== Baseball ===
- Jake Beckley (1867–1918), baseball player
- Chet Brewer (1907–1990), baseball player, scout, manager
- Duff Cooley (1873–1937), outfielder
- Johnny Hetki (born 1922), baseball player
- Jack Killilay (1887–1968), baseball player
- Walter McCoy (1923–2015), Negro leagues and Minor League Baseball player
- Fred Raymer (1875–1957), baseball player

=== Basketball ===
- Neil Dougherty (1961–2011), coach
- Wayne Simien (born 1983), power forward

=== Other sports ===
- Amy Hastings (born 1984), track and field athlete
- Sean Malto (born 1989), skateboarder

== See also ==
- List of lists of people from Kansas
- List of people from Leavenworth County, Kansas
