= Johnny Carver =

Johnny Carver may refer to:

- Johnny Carver (musician)
- Johnny Carver (sports author)
