= List of people from Prairie Village, Kansas =

This article is a list of notable individuals who were born in and/or have lived in Prairie Village, Kansas.

== Arts and entertainment ==
=== Film, television, and theatre ===
- Sandahl Bergman (1951– ), actress, dancer, stuntwoman
- Eric Darnell (1961– ), director, screenwriter, voice actor
- Chuck Norris (1940–2026), actor, martial artist, producer

=== Journalism ===
- Joe McGuff (1926–2006), Kansas City Star sportswriter and editor
- Ramesh Ponnuru (1974– ), columnist, pundit

=== Literature ===
- Jason Aaron (1973– ), comic book writer

=== Music ===
- Joyce DiDonato (1969– ), mezzo-soprano opera singer
- Abe Ismert, Eli Ismert, and Henry Ismert of the metal band Hammerhedd

== Business ==
- John Carmack (1970– ), computer programmer, co-founder of id Software
- Donald Fehr (1948– ), sports union executive
- Robert S. Kaplan (1957– ), President, Federal Reserve Bank of Dallas
- David Wittig (1955– ), energy executive

== Crime ==
- Debora Green (1951– ), convicted murderer

== Politics ==
=== National ===
- Larry Winn (1919–2017), U.S. Representative from Kansas
- Adam Hamilton (1964– ), pastor and U.S. Senator-elect from Kansas

=== State ===
- Robert Bennett (1927–2000), 39th Governor of Kansas (1975–1979)
- Marci Francisco (1950– ), Kansas state legislator
- Jim Roth (1968– ), Oklahoma politician

== Science ==
- Dan Connolly (born 1967), computer scientist
- Laura Stiles (born 1986), aerospace engineer

== Sports ==
=== Baseball ===
- Hank Bauer (1922–2007), right fielder, manager
- George Brett (1953– ), Hall of Fame designated hitter, 1st & 3rd baseman

=== Horse racing ===
- Ben Jones (1882–1961), thoroughbred horse trainer
- Horace Jones (1906–2001), thoroughbred horse trainer

=== Other ===
- Ray Evans (1922–1999), football halfback
- Ross William Guignon (1993– ), tennis player
- Tom Watson (1949– ), professional golfer

== See also ==
- Lists of people from Kansas
- List of people from Johnson County, Kansas
