= List of people from Garden City, Kansas =

The following is a list of notable individuals who were born in and/or have lived in Garden City, Kansas.

== Arts and entertainment ==
- Sanora Babb (1907–2005), novelist, journalist
- Jeremy Hubbard (1972– ), news anchor
- Frank Mantooth (1947–2004), jazz pianist, arranger
- Fred Myton (1885–1955), screenwriter

== Law enforcement ==
- Alvin Dewey (1912–1987), special agent of the Kansas Bureau of Investigation

== Military ==
- Kendall Carl Campbell (1917–1942), U.S. Naval Reserve aviator

== Politics ==
=== National ===
- John Cotteral (1864–1933), U.S. federal judge
- Clifford R. Hope (1893–1970), U.S. representative from Kansas
- Richard Hopkins (1873–1943), U.S. federal judge
- Dale Saffels (1921–2002), U.S. federal judge
- William Howard Thompson (1871–1928), U.S. senator from Kansas

=== State ===
- Don O. Concannon (1927–2013), candidate for governor in 1974
- Bob Lewis, member of the Kansas House of Representatives
- Roy Romer (1928– ), 39th governor of Colorado
- Jeff Whitham, former member of the Kansas House of Representatives

=== Local ===
- Webster Davis (1861–1923), mayor of Kansas City, Missouri
- Buffalo Jones (1844–1919), frontiersman, conservationist, co-founder of Garden City
- Chuck Reed (1948– ), 64th mayor of San Jose, California

== Sports ==
=== American football ===
- Thurman "Fum" McGraw (1927–2000), NFL defensive tackle
- Hal Patterson (1932–2011), CFL wide receiver
- John Zook (1947–2020), NFL defensive end

=== Baseball ===
- Gene Krug (1955– ), MLB pinch hitter
- Harry Short (1878–1954), Texas League stolen base leader 1907
- Todd Tichenor (1976– ), MLB umpire

=== Boxing ===
- Victor Ortíz (1987– ), welterweight, actor
- Brandon Rios (1986– ), lightweight

=== Other sports ===
- Mark Fox (1969– ), basketball coach
- Ray Watson (1898–1974), U.S. Olympic track and field athlete

== Other ==
- Joe Exotic (1963– ), former zoo operator, convicted felon, and politician
- Charles "Buffalo" Jones (1844–1919), cowboy and naturalist
- Julian Morgenstern (1881–1976), rabbi and Hebrew Union College professor and president
