= Walter Wenzel =

American violinist

Walter Wenzel, 1945

Walter Wenzel was an American classical violinist from Milwaukee, Wisconsin. He studied at the Chicago College of Music under Petrowitsch Bissing and Herbert Butler.
