= List of people from Butler County, Kansas =

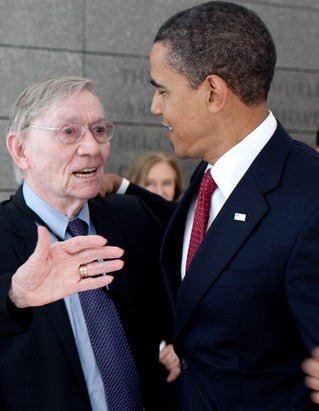
Charles T. Payne greets his great-nephew Barack Obama Payne is the younger brother of Madelyn Dunham, maternal grandmother of the 44th president of the United States.

The following is a list of people from Butler County, Kansas. The area includes the cities of El Dorado, Augusta, Rose Hill, and other cities rural areas in the county. Inclusion on the list should be reserved for notable people past and present who have resided in the county, either in cities or rural areas.

== Family of Barack Obama ==
- Madelyn Dunham, maternal grandmother of Barack Obama, 44th president of the United States
- Stanley Armour Dunham, paternal grandfather of Barack Obama
- Charles T. Payne, served in the U.S. military during World War II as a member of the division that liberated Ohrdruf, a subcamp of the Buchenwald concentration camp. He was 20 years old at the time. He is Barack Obama's great uncle (the younger brother of his late maternal grandmother Madelyn Lee Payne Dunham) and has been mentioned in Obama's speeches, including the one given in 2009 commemorating the anniversary of D-Day.

== Arts ==
- Steve Brodie, film actor
- Phyllis Haver, actress of the silent film era
- Jack Marshall, composer of the theme and incidental music for the 1960s TV series The Munsters
- Marion Koogler McNay, painter and art teacher who inherited a substantial oil fortune upon the death of her father; willed her fortune to be used to establish San Antonio's first museum of modern art, which today bears her name
- Kevin Schmidt, actor
- Mort Walker, comic artist best known for creating the newspaper comic strips Beetle Bailey in 1950 and Hi and Lois in 1954

== Athletics ==
- Beals Becker, outfielder in Major League Baseball from 1908 to 1915
- Clarence Beers, Major League Baseball pitcher who played in 1948 with the St. Louis Cardinals
- Monty Beisel, professional American football linebacker with the Kansas City Chiefs and other teams
- Ernie Blandin, professional American football offensive tackle who played six seasons for the Cleveland Browns and Baltimore Colts in the National Football League and All-America Football Conference (AAFC)
- Tom Borland, relief pitcher in Major League Baseball who played from 1960 through 1961 for the Boston Red Sox
- Kendall Gammon, professional football player
- Ralph Graham, college football and basketball player and coach
- Larry Hartshorn, professional offensive lineman with the Chicago Cardinals
- Tom Sturdivant, Major League Baseball pitcher who played for the New York Yankees, Kansas City Athletics, Boston Red Sox, Washington Senators, Pittsburgh Pirates, Detroit Tigers, and New York Mets
- Josh Swindell, Major League Baseball pitcher for the Cleveland Naps
- Ralph Winegarner, professional baseball player

== Law ==
- Rosalie E. Wahl (died 2013), first woman to serve on the Minnesota Supreme Court

== Politics ==
- Garner E. Shriver, U.S. representative from Kansas
- William Allen White, newspaper editor, politician, author, and leader of the Progressive movement
- Gerald Burton Winrod, pro-Nazi and anti-Semitic evangelist, author, and political activist

== Technology ==
- Almon Brown Strowger, early innovator of telephone technology

== See also ==
- Lists of people from Kansas
