= List of people from Olathe, Kansas =

The following is a list of people who were born in and/or have lived in the American city of Olathe, Kansas.

== Academia ==
- George Washington Carver (1860–1943), botanist, prominent African American leader
- J. Wayne Reitz (1908–1993), President of the University of Florida (1955–1967)
- Charles H. Zimmerman (1908–1996), aeronautical engineer

== Arts and entertainment ==
=== Film, television, and theatre ===
- Willie Aames (1960– ), actor
- Jennifer Bertrand, interior designer, television show host
- Adam Jamal Craig (1981– ), actor
- Ashley Litton (1983– ), beauty queen
- Michael McMillian (1978– ), actor
- Larry Parks (1914–1975), actor
- Chris Porter (1979– ), comedian
- Charles "Buddy" Rogers (1904–1999), actor

=== Journalism ===
- C. L. Edson (1881–1975), newspaper columnist, humorist, and poet
- Dan Ryckert (1984– ), journalist and author.

=== Music ===
- Johnny Dare (1968– ), Kansas City radio personality
- Charles Miller (1939–1980), musician
- Rob Pope, member of emo band The Get Up Kids
- Ryan Pope (1978– ), member of emo band The Get Up Kids
- Richie Pratt (1943–2015), jazz drummer, professional football player
- Jim Suptic (1977– ), member of emo band The Get Up Kids

=== Other visual arts ===
- Grace Bilger (1907–2000), painter

== Business ==
- Jesse Clyde Nichols (1880–1950), real estate developer
- Donald J. Tyson (1930–2011), food industry executive

== Politics ==
=== National ===
- Chauncey B. Little (1877–1952), U.S. Representative from Kansas
- Edward C. Little (1858–1924), U.S. Representative from Kansas
- James Kenneth Logan (1929–2018), U.S. federal judge
- Walter Lewis McVey Jr. (1922–2014), U.S. Representative from Kansas
- Vince Snowbarger (1949– ), U.S. Representative from Kansas (1997–1999)

=== State ===
- John Anderson Jr. (1917–2014), 36th Governor of Kansas (1961–1965)
- Keith Esau, Kansas state legislator
- Herbert S. Hadley (1872–1927), 32nd Governor of Missouri, chancellor of Washington University in St. Louis
- George H. Hodges (1866–1947), 19th Governor of Kansas
- Julia Lynn (1957– ), Kansas state legislator
- Robert Montgomery, Kansas state legislator
- Robert Olson (1969– ), Kansas state legislator
- Mark Parkinson (1957– ), 45th Governor of Kansas (2009–2011)
- Ron Ryckman Jr., Kansas state legislator
- John St. John (1833–1916), 8th Governor of Kansas (1879–1883), Prohibition Party Presidential candidate (1884)
- Harold Sebring (1898–1968), Florida Supreme Court justice

=== Local ===
- Albert I. Beach (1883–1939), 42nd Mayor of Kansas City, Missouri

== Sports ==
=== American football ===
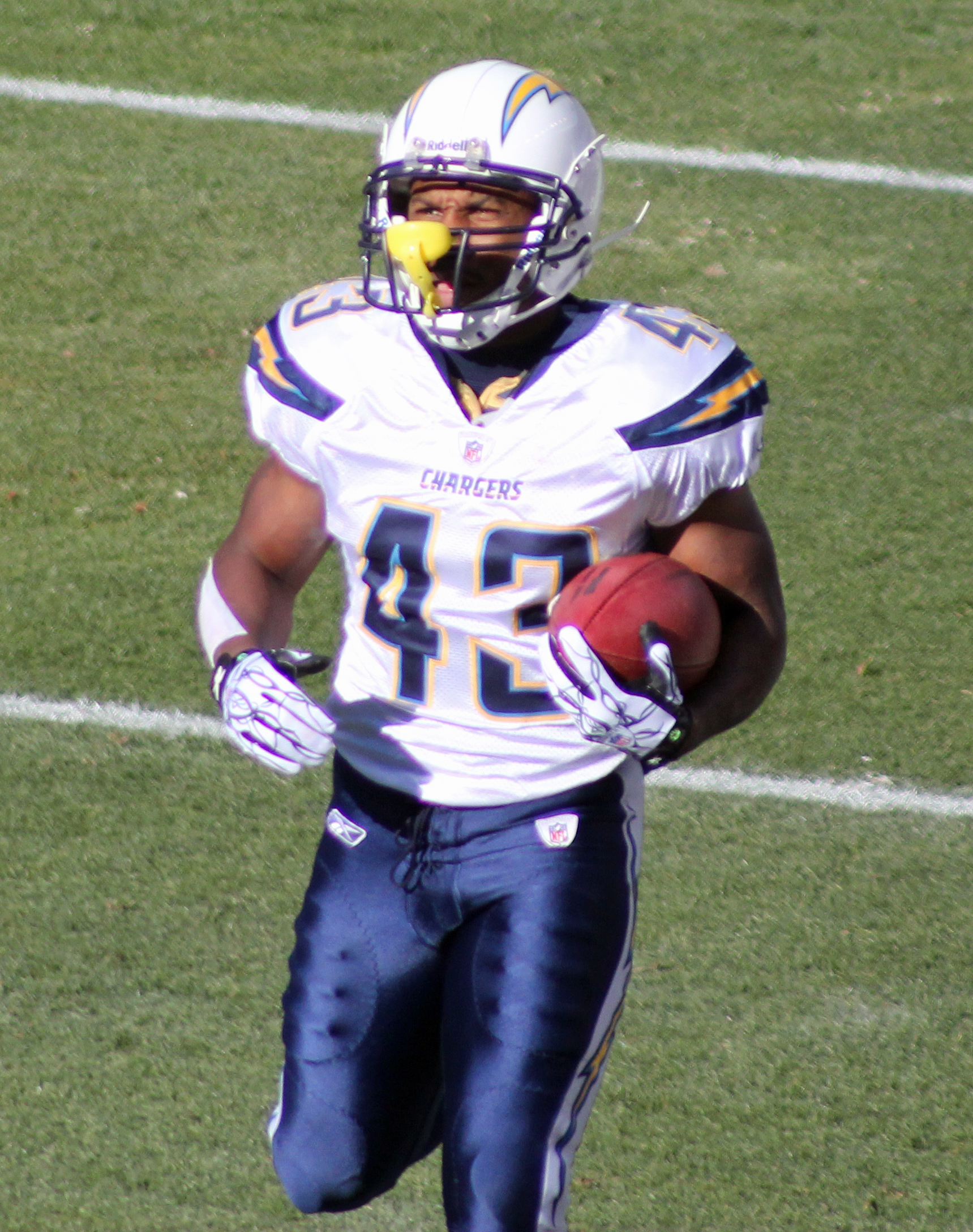
Darren Sproles grew up in Olathe.

- Arland Bruce III (1977– ), wide receiver for the BC Lions
- Don Davis (1972– ), linebacker, coach
- Bryan Shepherd (1991– ), cornerback
- Isaiah Simmons (1998– ), linebacker
- Darren Sproles (1983– ), running back

=== Baseball ===
- John Means, Baltimore Orioles pitcher
- Dan Glass (1959–2020 ), Kansas City Royals president
- Claude Hendrix (1889–1944), pitcher
- Dummy Taylor (1875–1958), pitcher

=== Basketball ===
- Manute Bol (1962–2010), NBA center, (1985–1994) born in Sudan and lived in Olathe late in his life.
- Willie Cauley-Stein (1993– ) center
- Danielle McCray (1987– ), forward

=== Other ===
- Johnny Carver (1995– ), sports author
- Stevana Case (1976– ), professional video gamer
- Steve Fisher (1982– ), snowboarder
- Eric Lynch (1978– ), poker player
- Michael Thomas (1988– ), soccer midfielder
- Scott Vermillion (1976-2020), soccer defender

== See also ==
- List of MidAmerica Nazarene Pioneers head football coaches
- List of people from Johnson County, Kansas
