= List of people from Clay County, Kansas =

This is a list of people from Clay County, Kansas. Inclusion on the list should be reserved for notable people past and present who have resided in the county, either in cities or rural areas.

== Academics ==
- Tenney Frank, scholar and historian

== Arts and entertainment ==
- Steve Doocy, host for Fox News' Fox & Friends
- William Penhallow Henderson, artist and architect
- Robert McAlmon, poet and author
- Robert E. Pearson, filmmaker and painter

== Athletes ==
- Herb Bradley, professional baseball player
- Bob Cain, pro baseball player
- Tracy Claeys, college football coach
- Brady Cowell, college basketball and football coach
- Eldon Danenhauer, offensive tackle for the Denver Broncos
- Nicole Ohlde, professional basketball player
- Ken Swenson, middle distance runner in 1972 Summer Olympics
- Waldo S. Tippin, college basketball and football coach
- Dave Wiemers, college football coach

== Medicine ==
- Warren Henry Cole, surgeon who pioneered X-ray use in medicine

== Politicians ==
- William Avery, Governor of Kansas from 1965 to 1967
- George Docking, former governor of Kansas
- Orchid I. Jordan, Missouri state legislator
- William D. Vincent, United States Representative

== See also ==
- Lists of people from Kansas
