= List of people from Ellis County, Kansas =

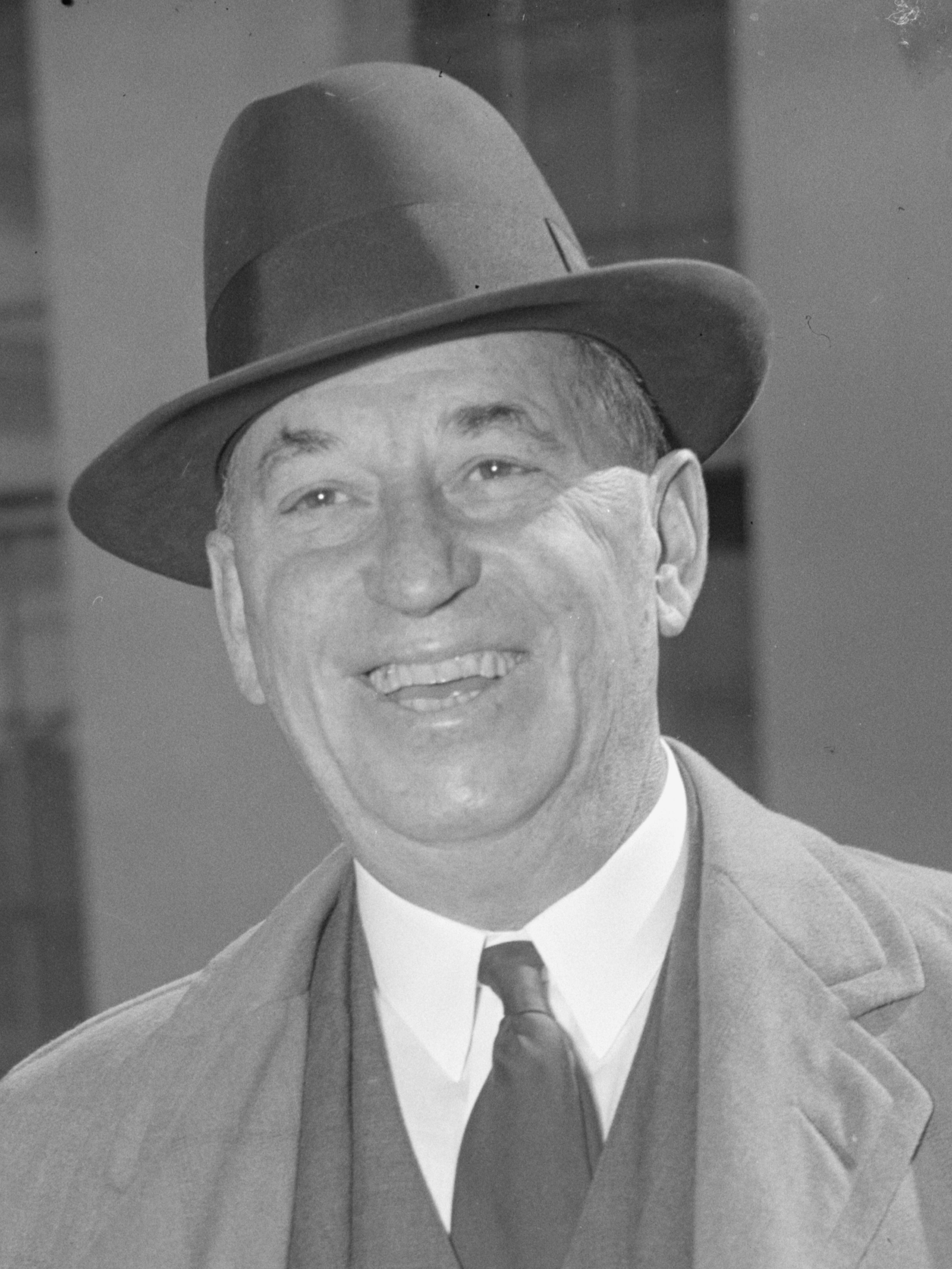
Walter Chrysler, the founder of the Chrysler, was born in Ellis, Kansas.

This is a list of people from Ellis County, Kansas, United States. Inclusion on the list should be reserved for notable people past and present who have resided in the county, either in cities or rural areas.

== Academics ==
- Maurice L. Albertson, former head of the Colorado State University Research Foundation
- Petrowitsch Bissing, violin instructor
- Nola Ochs, world's oldest college graduate, from Fort Hays State University

== Arts and entertainment ==
- Rob Beckley, musician
- Robert Bogue, actor
- Rebecca Staab, actress
- Michael Wittig, member of the Dove Award-winning and Grammy-nominated Christian hard rock band Pillar

== Athletics ==
See also List of Fort Hays State Tigers head football coaches

- Greg Anderson, personal trainer of Barry Bonds
- Monty Basgall, coach for the Los Angeles Dodgers
- Ken Crandall, head football coach for the Southwestern Moundbuilders
- Steve Crosby, National Football League player and coach
- Elon Hogsett, professional baseball player
- Tony Leiker, NFL defensive end
- Tom Matukewicz, head football coach of the Northern Illinois Huskies
- Tim McCarty, college football coach
- Les Miller, National Football League player
- Frankie Neal, player for the Green Bay Packers
- Willard Schmidt, professional baseball player

== Business ==
- Philip Anschutz, business magnate
- Walter Chrysler, founder of the Chrysler Corporation

== Crime ==
- Robert Courtney, pharmacist convicted for pharmaceutical fraud

== Folklore ==
- Elizabeth Polly, the so-called "Blue Light Lady"

== Journalism ==
- John L. Allen Jr., journalist
- Melissa McDermott, news anchor

== Politics ==
- Jeff Colyer, Lieutenant Governor of Kansas
- Sheila Frahm, United States Senator
- Kathryn O'Loughlin McCarthy, U.S. Representative from Kansas
- Jerry Moran, U.S. Senator from Kansas
- Andrew Frank Schoeppel, 29th Governor of Kansas
- Frances Tilton Weaver, feminist legal pioneer

== Religion ==
- Virgil C. Dechant, twelfth Supreme Knight of the Knights of Columbus
- Firmin Martin Schmidt, Roman Catholic bishop

== See also ==
- List of Fort Hays State University people
- Lists of people from Kansas
