= List of Emporia State Hornets in the NFL draft =

The Emporia State Hornets football team, representing Emporia State University, has had ten players selected in the National Football League (NFL) since the league began holding drafts in 1936). This includes two players selected in the third round. The Dallas Cowboys have the most ESU players, as they have drafted two Hornets.

Each NFL franchise seeks to add new players through the annual NFL Draft. The draft rules were last updated in 2009. The team with the worst record from the previous year picks first, the next-worst team second, and so on. Teams that did not make the playoffs are ordered by their regular-season record with any remaining ties broken by strength of schedule. Playoff participants are sequenced after non-playoff teams, based on their round of elimination (wild card, division, conference, and Super Bowl).

== Key ==
B	Back	K	Kicker	NT	Nose tackle
C	Center	LB	Linebacker	DB	Defensive back
P	Punter	HB	Halfback	DE	Defensive end
QB	Quarterback	WR	Wide receiver	DT	Defensive tackle
RB	Running back	G	Guard	E	End
OT	Offensive tackle	TE	Tight end	FB	Fullback

*	Selected to a Pro Bowl
†	Won an NFL championship
‡	Selected to a Pro Bowl and won an NFL championship

== Players selected ==
Year	Round	Overall	Player	Team	Position
1942	7	57	Wayne Goldsmith	Brooklyn Dodgers	B
1955	6	66	Lem Harkey	Pittsburgh Steelers	B
1956	17	199	Bill Danenhauer	Baltimore Colts	DE
1967	11	272	Jim Whitcomb	Pittsburgh Steelers	WR
1970	16	407	Steve Bushore	Washington Redskins	WR
1970	16	415	Bruce Cerone	Minnesota Vikings	WR
1973	4	89	John Lohmeyer	Kansas City Chiefs	DE
1974	8	195	Mike Denimarck	Detroit Lions	LB
1976	13	373	Steve Hamilton	Los Angeles Rams	QB
1979	5	118	Steve Henry	St. Louis Cardinals	DB
1991	7	173	Leon Lett	Dallas Cowboys	DE
1994s	10	0	John Davis	Dallas Cowboys	TE
