= Thomas Ewing III =

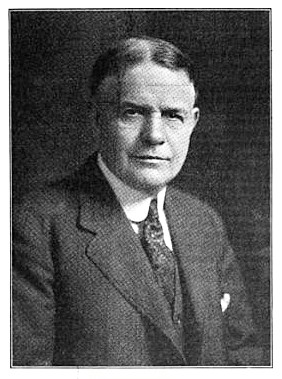
- Thomas Ewing III in 1913
- Born: May 21, 1862; Leavenworth, Kansas
- Died: December 7, 1942 (aged 80); Yonkers, New York
- Education: Columbia College of New York, B.A., 1883, M.A., 1886; Georgetown University, LL.B., 1890, LL.D., 1914
- Title: Commissioner of the U.S. Patent Office
- Term: 1913 to 1917
- Predecessor: Edward Bruce Moore
- Successor: James T. Newton
- Political party: Democratic
- Spouse: Anna Phillips Cochran
- Children: Alexandra; Thomas IV; William Francis Cochran; Sherman; Ellen Cox; Gifford Cochran; Bayard
- Parent(s): Thomas Ewing Jr. and Ellen Ewing Cox
- Relatives: Thomas Ewing, Sr., grandfather George Ewing, great grandfather Reasin Beall, great grandfather Alexander Smith Cochran, brother-in-law Newbold Noyes, Jr., grandson

Thomas Ewing III (21 May 1862, Leavenworth, Kansas, USA – 7 December 1942, Yonkers, New York) was the 33rd Commissioner of the U.S. Patent Office, serving between 1913 and 1917. He was the son of General Thomas Ewing Jr. and the grandson of Secretary Thomas Ewing, Sr.

== Background ==
Thomas was born during the Civil War, on 21 May 1862, at Leavenworth, Kansas, the second son of Thomas Ewing, Jr. (1829–1896) and his wife Ellen Ewing Cox (1833–1919). At that time, his father, Thomas Ewing, Jr., was the Chief Justice of the Supreme Court of Kansas but he resigned his position to recruit an Army infantry regiment and to fight for the Union. His son was known as Thomas Ewing, Jr. until his father died and then he graduated to Thomas Ewing, Sr. But he was actually the fifth Thomas Ewing of his line. His great-great-great grandfather was the first Thomas Ewing, who came to America from Derry, Ireland, in 1718. On his mother's side, the fifth Thomas was the great grandson of a War of 1812 general and U.S. Congressman, Reasin Beall of Wooster, Ohio. Ewing grew up in Washington, D.C. (1865–1870), and Lancaster, Ohio (1870–1879), while his father worked as a lawyer and a U.S. Congressman.

== Education ==
A graduate of public schools in Lancaster, Ohio, Thomas went to the College of Wooster for two years, from 1879 to 1881, and transferred to Columbia College of New York, where he would remain for seven years, until 1888. In these seven years, he graduated with a Bachelor of Arts degree in 1883 and a Master of Arts in 1886, worked as a tutor of physics for the School of Mines from 1885 to 1888, and went to the School of Law in his last year. Then he transferred again, this time to Georgetown University in Washington, D.C. In 1890, he graduated with a Bachelor of Laws from there. By then, he had gained memberships in the Sigma Chi fraternity and, in 1885, Phi Beta Kappa society. He was later awarded an honorary Doctorate of Laws in 1914 by Georgetown University.

== Career ==
While he was attending classes at Georgetown, Thomas also worked as an assistant examiner at the U.S. Patent Office, from October 1888 to October 1890, but, in 1891, he moved to New York City and became a patent attorney. For the next five years, he and his father, also a patent attorney, shared their law offices as Ewing & Ewing in Manhattan and their home in Yonkers, New York. But they had law partners. One of them was the General's son and Thomas's brother, Hampton Denman Ewing, Sr. After his father was struck and killed by a cable car in 1896, Thomas continued to practice law, this time with Hampton. Thomas made his name as the counsel for Frank J. Sprague on the multiple-unit control of electric train operations and for Professor Michael I. Pupin on long-distance telephony. When he was returned to the U.S. Patent Office as the 33rd Commissioner in 1913, he was the President of the Current Literature Publishing Company and on the Board of Directors of the Crocker-Wheeler Company of Ampere, New Jersey.

Ewing was the Commissioner of Patents from 15 August 1913 to 15 August 1917. When he began, he kept the tradition of market monopoly on the control of patents by declaring that "a man had the right to say what the resale price of his patent should be". A strong supporter of patent reform, he worked for ways of streamlining and expediting patent operations. He often complained about the case backlogs, cramped offices and low salaries of the examiners and other members of the U.S. Patent Office. He tried to get a reform bill through the Congress in 1915 but it failed. However, he did have the Patent Office regulations revised for "brevity, speed and efficiency". He still ran into more problems when World War I began. Many of the workers left the Patent Corps to go "Over There" to France with the Army and Navy Corps. The war also complicated the conditions for the patent applications on both sides of the Atlantic Ocean, forcing Ewing to declare that the United States would not take over the patents from the citizens of enemy nations. But he drew criticism, and this situation would not be resolved until 1921, when the Nolan Bill was passed by the Congress. Nevertheless, in spite of the difficulties, under Ewing's administration, two agencies were created. One of them was the Patent Office Society, formed in 1917 "to promote and foster a true appreciation of the American Patent System". The other was the National Research Council (NRC), organized in 1916 to oversee the scientific and technical services for the war effort. The NRC was asked by Ewing to assemble a committee specifically to prepare the legislation to reform the patent laws. It eventually succeeded in having the Lampert Patent Office Bill passed by the Congress – in 1922, five years after the end of Ewing's term.

Ewing was notable for another reason. He consistently ignored President Wilson's policies of discrimination against blacks in the U.S. Civil Service. Before he was appointed as the Commissioner, he had been the first Chairman of the Legal Committee for a year since 1911, when it was established by the NAACP.

When Thomas resigned in 1917, he was appointed as the Chairman of the Munitions Board of the War and Navy Departments for the rest of World War I. This board encouraged the munitions and aircraft industries to pool their patents to help the technological development for the war effort. When the war was over, Ewing returned to Yonkers and resumed his law practice. But he continued to lecture on patent law at Georgetown University. He had begun in 1914 and he would continue until 1932. He later served as the President of the American Group of the International Association for the Protection of Industrial Property, of the New York Intellectual Property Law Association from 1928 to 1929, and of the American Patent Law Association in 1931.

Ewing died on 7 December 1942 at his home in Yonkers after a long illness.

== Activities ==
Like his father, Thomas was a Democrat. He ran for the Mayor of Yonkers as the Democratic candidate twice, in 1897 and 1899, but he lost each time. However, he did join the Yonkers School Board in 1897 and stayed until 1903. Then he switched to the Yonkers Police Board for two more years, from 1905 to 1907. He was also active in the operations of three local hospitals, the Hollywood Inn (a workingman's club built in Yonkers by his father-in-law), and the New York Juvenile Asylum (now Children's Village).

His interests were not limited to politics. He was also a playwright, a scholar, a translator and an editor. In 1902, he wrote and published "Jonathan", a tragedy based on the Biblical story about Jonathan's friendship with David. His metrical translations of Horace, from the Latin, also appeared in the American magazine, Poet Lore. Besides being the President of a publishing company, he was also the editor and publisher of a 1928 book about his great grandfather, The Military Journal of George Ewing, 1754–1824, a Soldier of Valley Forge.

== Family ==
On 24 October 1894, in Yonkers, Thomas married Anna Phillips Cochran (1872–1943). She was the eldest daughter of William Francis Cochran, Sr., a carpet manufacturer, and his wife, Eva Smith, and the older sister of the yachtsman Alexander Smith Cochran. Together Thomas and Anna had seven children: Alexandra, Thomas IV, William Francis Cochran, Sherman, Ellen Cox, Gifford Cochran, and Bayard. The family home was "Kinross", an estate at 616 Palisade Avenue in Yonkers.

When Thomas was the Commissioner, the Ewings lived across Lafayette Square from the White House at 1607 H Street, N.W., in Washington, D.C. Their home was named the Slidell House after its previous resident, Senator John Slidell of Louisiana. It was once the home of Daniel S. Lamont, the Secretary of War for the second Cleveland Administration. It was also "just across the next block" from the Blair House – the former residence of Thomas's grandfather, Thomas Ewing, Sr.

== Bibliography ==
- "Thomas Ewing, Jr." Electrical Review and Western Electrician, Vol. LXIII, No. 3 (19 July 1913), p. 109
- "Ewing, Thomas, Jr.", Who's Who in New York City and State: A Biographical Dictionary of Contemporaries, 5th Biennial Edition, 1911 (New York City: W. F. Brainard, 1911), p. 312
- "Ewing, Thomas, Jr.", Men and Women of America: A Biographical Dictionary of Contemporaries (New York City: L. R. Hamersly Co., 1910), pp. 580-581
- "Ewing, Thomas, Jr.", The National Cyclopædia of American Biography, Vol. XIV (New York City: James T[erry]. White & Co., 1910), p. 101
- James S. Easby-Smith, "EWING, Thomas Jr., A. M., LL. B., Law. Class of 1890" Georgetown University in the District of Columbia 1789-1907: Its Founders, Benefactors, Officers, Instructors and Alumni, Vol. III (New York City and Chicago: The Lewis Publishing Co., 1907), pp. 250-251.
- Albert Nelson Marquis, ed., "Ewing, Thomas, Jr.," Who's Who in America: A Biographical Dictionary of Notable Living Men and Women of the United States, 1908-1909, Vol. 5 (Chicago: A[lbert]. N[elson]. Marquis & Co., 1908), p. 596
- "Ewing, Thomas, Jr.", In: E[milius]. O[viatt]. Randall, ed., "Personal Sketches of the Speakers", Ohio Centennial Anniversary Celebration at Chillicothe, May 20–21, 1903, under the Auspices of the Ohio State Archæological and Historical Society: Complete Proceedings, E. O. Randall, ed., (Columbus, OH: Press of Fred. J. Heer, 1903), p. 695
