= List of MidAmerica Nazarene Pioneers head football coaches =

The MidAmerica Nazarene Pioneers football program is a college football team that represents MidAmerica Nazarene University in the Heart of America Athletic Conference (HAAC), a part of the NAIA. The team has had eight head coaches since its first recorded football game in 1979.

The current coach is Paul Hansen, who first took the position for the 2020 season.

== Key ==
Key to symbols in coaches list
General		Overall		Conference		Postseason (Note: Although the first Rose Bowl Game was played in 1902, it has been continuously played since the 1916 game, and is recognized as the oldest bowl game by the NCAA. "—" indicates any season prior to 1916 when postseason games were not played.)	
No.	Order of coaches (Note: A running total of the number of head coaches, with coaches who served separate tenures being counted only once. Interim head coaches are represented with "Int" and are not counted in the running total. "—" indicates the team played but either without a coach or no coach is on record. "X" indicates an interim year without play.)	GC	Games coached	CW	Conference wins	PW	Postseason wins
DC	Division championships	OW	Overall wins	CL	Conference losses	PL	Postseason losses
CC	Conference championships	OL	Overall losses	CT	Conference ties	PT	Postseason ties
NC	National championships	OT	Overall ties (Note: Overtime rules in college football were introduced in 1996, making ties impossible in the period since.)	C%	Conference winning percentage		
†	Elected to the College Football Hall of Fame	O%	Overall winning percentage (Note: When computing the win–loss percentage, a tie counts as half a win and half a loss.)				

== Coaches ==
Statistics correct as of the end of the 2024 college football season.

No.	Name	Term	GC	OW	OL	OT	O%	CW	CL	CT	C%	PW	PL	Bowl record	CCs	Awards
1	Gordon DeGraffenreid	1979–1990	115	44	71	0	.383	26	52	0	.333	—	—	—	1 (1985)	
2	Mike Redwine	1991–2000	107	53	52	2	.505	38	41	2	.481	1	1	0–1	—	
3	Mike Cochran	2001–2005	58	46	12	0	.793	41	8	0	.837	1	4	1–0	2 (2002–2003)	
4	Jed Stugart	2006–2008	33	26	7	0	.788	25	5	0	.833	0	2	—	1 (2008)	
5	Jonathan Quinn	2009–2011	58	45	13	0	.776	40	7	0	.851	4	4	—	2 (2010–2011)	
6	Brian Wilmer	2014–2017	44	26	18	0	.591	17	7	0	.708	0	1	—	1 (2014)	
7	Todd Sturdy	2018–2019	22	11	11	0	.500	4	5	0	.444	—	—	—	—	—
8	Paul Hansen	2020–present	52	30	22	0	.577	15	11	0	.577	0	1	—	South Division: 2 (2023–2024)	—

== See also ==
- List of people from Olathe, Kansas
