= Jeff Whitham =

American politician

Jeff Whitham served as a Republican member of the Kansas House of Representatives, representing the 123rd district 2007–2011.

Prior to his election to the House, Whitham served as mayor and on the city commission of Garden City. He has worked as President and CEO of Western State Bank since 1983.

Whitham is a graduate of Kansas State University and earned his Doctorate in Law from Washburn Law School.

== Committee membership ==
- Appropriations
- General Government Budget
- Judiciary (Vice-Chair)
- Rules and Journal
- Select Committee on the Kansas Public Employee Retirement System {KPERS}
- Joint Committee on Pensions, Investments and Benefits

== Major donors ==
The top 5 donors to Whitham's 2008 campaign:

1. Whitham, Jeff $4,000
2. Kansas Assoc of Realtors $1,000
3. Singularis Group $749
4. Unknown Contributor $125
5. Gigot, Terry $100
