= Eric Bailey (American football) =

American football player (born 1963)

Profile
- Position: Tight end

Personal information
- Born: May 12, 1963 (age 63); Fort Worth, Texas, U.S.
- Listed height: 6 ft 5 in (1.96 m)
- Listed weight: 233 lb (106 kg)

Career information
- College: Kansas State

Career history
- 1985: Atlanta Falcons
- 1986: New York Giants*
- 1987: Detroit Lions*
- 1987, 1988-1989: Philadelphia Eagles
- * Offseason or practice squad member only
- Stats at Pro Football Reference

Eric Renard Bailey (born May 12, 1963) is an American former professional football player who was a tight end with the Philadelphia Eagles of the National Football League (NFL) in 1987. He played college football for the Kansas State Wildcats.
