= List of Pittsburg State Gorillas head football coaches =

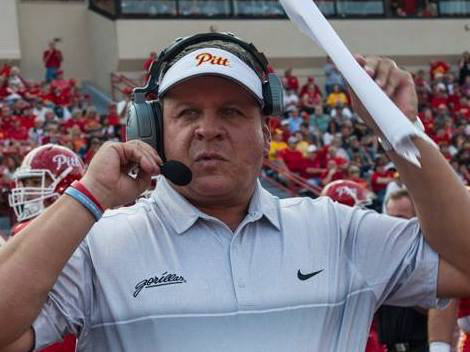
Coach Tim Beck at a football game in 2016

The Pittsburg State Gorillas football program is a college football team that represents Pittsburg State University in the Mid-America Intercollegiate Athletics Association, a part of the NCAA Division II. The team has had 15 head coaches since its first recorded football game in 1908. The current coach is Tom Anthony.

== Key ==
Key to symbols in coaches list
General		Overall		Conference		Postseason (Note: Although the first Rose Bowl Game was played in 1902, it has been continuously played since the 1916 game, and is recognized as the oldest bowl game by the NCAA. "—" indicates any season prior to 1916 when postseason games were not played.)	
No.	Order of coaches (Note: A running total of the number of head coaches, with coaches who served separate tenures being counted only once. Interim head coaches are represented with "Int" and are not counted in the running total. "—" indicates the team played but either without a coach or no coach is on record. "X" indicates an interim year without play.)	GC	Games coached	CW	Conference wins	PW	Postseason wins
DC	Division championships	OW	Overall wins	CL	Conference losses	PL	Postseason losses
CC	Conference championships	OL	Overall losses	CT	Conference ties	PT	Postseason ties
NC	National championships	OT	Overall ties (Note: Overtime rules in college football were introduced in 1996, making ties impossible in the period since.)	C%	Conference winning percentage		
†	Elected to the College Football Hall of Fame	O%	Overall winning percentage (Note: When computing the win–loss percentage, a tie counts as half a win and half a loss.)				

== Coaches ==
No.	Name	Term	GC	OW	OL	OT	O%	CW	CL	CT	C%	PW	PL	CCs	Awards
1	Albert McLeland	1908	6	2	2	2	.500	—	—	—	—	—	—	—	—
2	John Fuhrer	1909–1914, 1918	50	26	22	2	.540	1	8	2	.182	0	0	0	—
3	Ray Courtright	1915–1917	28	15	11	2	.571	8	5	1	.607	0	0	0	—
4	Garfield Weede	1919–1928	87	46	33	6	.576	34	25	4	.571	0	0	2	—
5	Blue Howell	1929–1935, 1937	71	35	30	6	.535	20	18	5	.523	0	0	1	—
6	Charles Morgan	1936, 1938–1948	102	44	43	15	.505	27	23	7	.535	0	0	2	—
7	Carnie Smith	1949–1966	174	116	52	6	.684	61	21	4	.733	3	1	5	—
8	Tom Lester	1967–1975	91	48	38	5	.555	26	13	2	.659	0	0	1	—
9	Ron Randleman	1976–1981	63	36	25	2	.587	26	13	1	.663	2	2	2	—
10	Bruce Polen	1982–1983	19	13	6	0	.684	10	4	0	.714	0	0	1	—
11	Mike Mayerske	1984	9	5	4	0	.556	4	3	0	.571	0	0	0	—
12	Dennis Franchione	1985–1989	59	53	6	0	.898	37	1	0	.974	7	4	5	—
13	Chuck Broyles	1990–2009	247	198	47	2	.806	149	29	1	.835	20	14	9	—
14	Tim Beck	2010–2019	117	82	35	0	.701	69	34	0	.670	6	0	2	—
15	Brian Wright	2020–2023	41	33	8	0	.805	28	4	0	.875	2	2	2	—
16	Tom Anthony	2024–2026	24	22	13	0	.629	19	10	0	.655	1	2	1	—

== See also ==
- Lists of people from Kansas
