= Mike Osborn (American football) =

American football player (born 1955)

No. 57
- Position: Linebacker

Personal information
- Born: November 19, 1955 (age 70); San Antonio, Texas, U.S.
- Listed height: 6 ft 5 in (1.96 m)
- Listed weight: 235 lb (107 kg)

Career information
- High school: Shawnee Mission South
- College: Kansas State
- NFL draft: 1978: undrafted

Career history
- Philadelphia Eagles (1978)

Career NFL statistics
- Games played: 16
- Games started: 1
- Stats at Pro Football Reference

Michael Joseph Osborn (born November 19, 1955) is an American former professional football player who was a linebacker for the Philadelphia Eagles of National Football League (NFL). He played college football for the Kansas State University.
