= Petrowitsch Bissing =

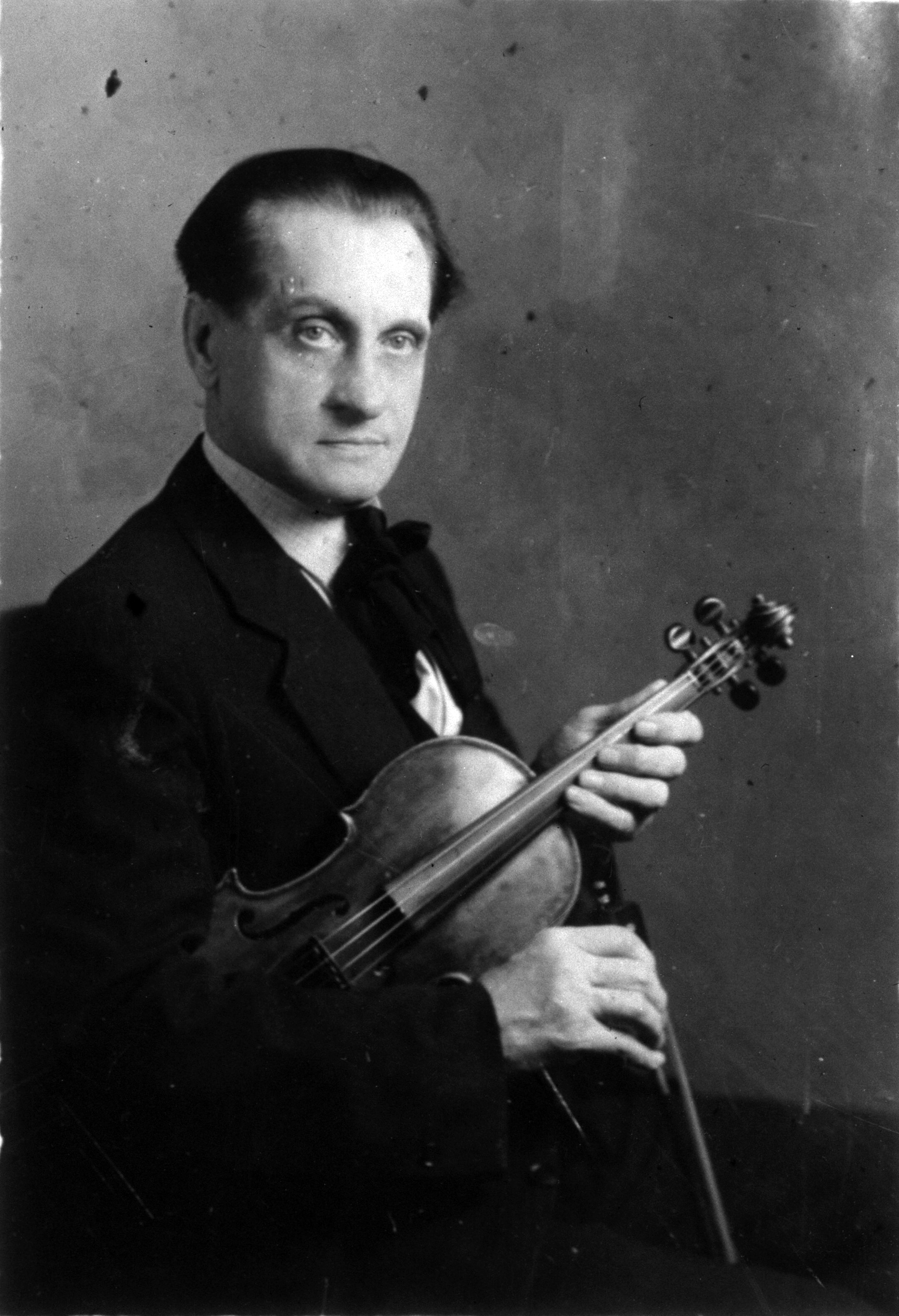
- Bissing c. 1920

Background information
- Born: 1871; Marks
- Died: 30 November 1961 (aged 89–90) Wisconsin
- Occupations: Founder and president of Bissing's Conservatory of Music
- Instrument: Violin
- Formerly of: Eddie South, Francis Boucher, Walter Wenzel

Peter "Petrowitsch" Bissing (1871 in Russia – 30 November 1961 in Wisconsin, United States) was the founder and president of Bissing's Conservatory of Music in Hays, Kansas and later in Topeka. He was known as an instructor of music and specialized in the violin, publishing multiple works on the instruction of the instrument. He was among the top instructors of his day in the expression of vibrato and published a book titled Cultivation of the Violin Vibrato Tone.

In 1876, Bissing arrived in Ellis County from the Volga River area of Russia with his family. He was about five years old when his family arrived in Kansas and he began to study music on a homemade four-octave organ made by his father. At 8 years old, he began learning to play the violin. As he grew older, Bissing studied at the Chicago College of Music alongside jazz violinist Eddie South and finished violin instruction under Francis Boucher. He also was an instructor of Walter Wenzel

On January 2, 1901, Bissing began the Bissing Conservatory of Music and offered instruction in vocal, piano, violin, organ, harmony and composition. But it was in June 1903 when Bissing received an invitation to study at Prague under Otakar Sevcik. Bissing left to complete his studies and returned to Topeka in 1906 to reorganize his teaching conservatory. Upon returning, he adopted the stage name of Petrowitsch Bissing.

== See also ==
- List of defunct colleges and universities in Kansas
- List of people from Ellis County, Kansas
