= Scot Sothern =

American photographer and writer (born 1949)

Scot Sothern (born 1949) is an American writer/photographer/artist. He is best known for his controversial black and white photographs and stories of prostitutes in Southern California, whom he photographed from 1986 to 1990. In 2010, he began photographing and writing about sex workers in Skid Row, Los Angeles. Sothern described the photographs as exposés that expose both the women and also the artist behind the camera.Sothern has continued writing, publishing, and exhibiting work globally. He lives In Los Angeles.

== Biography ==
Scot Sothern was born to a portrait and wedding photographer in the Missouri Ozarks. He spent 40 unsettled years as a freelance photographer in the US and abroad. His first solo exhibit, Lowlife, was held at the Drkrm Gallery in Los Angeles in 2010. His first book, Lowlife, was published in the U.K. by Stanley Barker in 2011 and as an ebook by powerHouse Books in 2013. The British Journal of Photography called Lowlife "The year's most controversial photobook". Curb Service: A Memoir, was published by Soft Skull Press in July 2013, and Streetwalkers was published by PowerHouse Books in 2016. Sothern has been in solo and group shows in NYC, Miami, and Los Angeles as well as Ottawa, London, Basel and Paris. In 2013 and 2014, Scot wrote 52 photo-illustrated columns for Vice Magazine: Sothern Exposure and Nocturnal Submissions. In 2017 Sothern's novel BigCity was published by Stalking Horse Press.

== Reception ==
In 2011, The British Journal of Photography commenting on Lowlife wrote, "Scot Sothern makes this year's most controversial photobook".

Roger Ballen in 2021 opined, "Scot Sothern has bravely and empathetically entered a hidden world of humanity. A place where the human condition bares itself on all levels. This penetrating book of photographs and text will haunt and challenge the viewer".

== Exhibitions ==
- 2024 - These Days LA Gallery, Los Angeles - LOOK AT ME - SHOPPING FOR GOD.
- 2022 These Days - Los Angeles -Generations, a solo show, Family Tree Vintage Chibachrome prints; IDENTITY, antique ambrotype plates with contemporary archival transparencies
- 2018 The Door Gallery, Hollywood, CA. Group show and literary reading
- 2018 Cal State University, Dominguez Hills, CA, Flesh & Stone, Paired Photos, Scot Sothern & Andy Romanoff
- 2017 Noh/Wave Gallery, Los Angeles, CA, I AM a group exhibition, Vintage Prints and New Work
- 2016, Little Big Man Gallery, Los Angeles, CA - Streetwalkers, Vintage Prints
- 2015, Mindy Solomon Gallery, Miami, FL – Sad City - The Way We See It, Scot Sothern & Muir Vidler
- 2010, DRKRM, Los Angeles, US
- 2012, La Petite Mort Gallery, Ottawa, Ontario, Canada
- 2012, The Great Eastern Bear, London, UK
- 2013, DRKRM, Los Angeles, US. A New Low
- 2015, Daniel Cooney Fine Art, NYC Lowlife, Vintage, 1985 – 1991
- 2014, Photo LA – A New Low & Lowlife – drkrm Gallery
- 2013, Space Eight Gallery, St. Augustine, FL – Rise of the Art Dorks, group show.
- 2013, Mindy Solomon Gallery, Miami, FL – Post Coital, group show
- 2013, Balzer ART projects – Basel, Switzerland, Subversive Narratives, group show
- 2012, Mindy Solomon Gallery, Miami, FL – Explicit Content, group show
- 2011 DRKRM Gallery, Los Angeles, Street Life, a group show
- 2011 BC Space Gallery, Laguna Beach, CA, Capital Crimes, a group show
- 2010 New Puppy Gallery, Los Angeles, Framed Stories, group show
- 1991 Marge Neikrug Gallery, NYC. Rated X, group show

== Bibliography ==
- Sothern, Scot. 2011. Lowlife. London: Stanley Barker ISBN 978-0-9569922-0-8.

Sothern, Scot (2013). Curb service: a memoir. Berkeley: Soft Skull Press. ISBN 978-1-59376-520-0.

- Sothern, Scot. 2013. An American Lowlife, digital book.
- Sothern, Scot. 2015 Sad City Straylight Press ISBN 978-0-9939605-1-2
- Sothern, Scot (2015). Streetwalkers (First ed.). Brooklyn, NY: powerHouse Books. ISBN 978-1-57687-761-6.
- Sothern, Scot (2017). Bigcity. Stalking Horse Press. ISBN 978-0-9970629-7-7.
- Sothern, Scot 2019 Little Miss. drkrm Editions, ISBN 978-0-578-45513-6
- Sothern, Scot 2022 "FAMILY TREE" These Days LA.
- Sothern, Scot (2024). Look at Me. Drkrm Editions. ISBN 978-1-7361070-2-7.
