= Marvin Ash =

American jazz pianist (1914–1974)

Background information
- Born: October 4, 1914; Lamar, Colorado, U.S.
- Died: September 21, 1974 (aged 59) Los Angeles, California
- Genres: Jazz, dixieland
- Occupation: Musician
- Instrument: Piano
- Years active: 1940s–1950s
- Labels: Jazz Man, Capitol, Decca

Marvin E. Ashbaugh (October 4, 1914 – August 21, 1974) was an American jazz pianist.

== Early life ==
He was born in Lamar, Colorado. His father, Roy Ashbaugh, was a barber. His mother's name was Nora (Tuttle) Ashbaugh. He grew up in Junction City, Kansas and Emporia, Kansas. He started playing with bands during high school. He worked with Count Basie, Wallie Stoeffer, Con Conrad, Herman Waldman and Jack Crawford. Ash was inspired by hearing pianist Earl Hines perform on a visit to Abilene in 1931. He had a fortunate encounter at Jenkins' Music Store when, seated at one of three grand pianos, was Joe Sullivan, showing his own composition "Little Rock Getaway" to Fats Waller and Arthur Schutt, seated at the other two pianos. This inspired Ash to learn to play in a similar style as the three of them.

== Music career ==
=== Living and working in Oklahoma ===
At the age of 22 he moved to Tulsa, Oklahoma, and worked in radio as a studio pianist, musical director, and announcer at KVOO-FM. This allowed him to learn about different piano styles. His favorite musicians were stride pianists James P. Johnson and Fats Waller, boogie-woogie pianist Pete Johnson, and jazz pianists Earl Hines, Art Tatum, Teddy Wilson, and long-time friend Bob Zurke.

Ash enlisted in the Army on January 16, 1942, and was assigned to Fort Sill in Oklahoma. The terms of his enlistment were "for the duration of the War or other emergency, plus six months, subject to the discretion of the President or otherwise according to law." His civilian occupation was listed as "blacksmith, band or orchestra leader, or musician." He remained in the Army for six months after the end of the war.

=== Playing piano in Los Angeles ===
After the end of his service in the Army, he moved to Los Angeles and found work with trumpeter Wingy Manone's band. This resulted in some of his earliest ensemble recordings, in 1946. In 1947, jazz guitarist and banjoist Nappy Lamare and associates opened Club 47 (named for Musician's Union No. 47) in Studio City, an active music strip in the burgeoning San Fernando Valley. His performances at Club 47 led to sessions with Clive Acker's Jump Records as a soloist in late 1947, and with Rosy McHargue's Memphis Five. With an American Federation of Musicians strike against the record companies looming in 1948, recording studios were crowded in November and December 1947 as they tried to record last-minute sessions, and Ash was kept busy during this two-month period. His work with McHargue also resulted in sessions with Lamare and others at Capitol Records, recording as Nappy Lamare's Levee Loungers and Marvin Ash and his Mason Dixon Music. Ash performed regularly on radio at KRKD and television on KHJ-TV and appeared at the Hangover Club in Hollywood.

Ash's playing caught the attention of Capitol's producer and A&R man Lou Busch who hired Ash to record a few more sides in 1949 with a small ensemble. Most of these tracks were released on 10" and later 12" albums of honky-tonk piano music. Ash's interpretations of "Maple Leaf Rag", "Cannon Ball", and "Fidgety Feet" were a contrast to Busch's arranged honky-tonk style and colleague Ray Turner's novelty recordings. This was Ash's last session for Capitol.

=== Lounges and Disney ===
In 1950s, Ash played in cocktail lounges in Los Angeles but had few recording dates as a soloist, instead working as a sideman on many undocumented studio dates. Some of these included recording or live sessions with trombonist Jack Teagarden, clarinetist Matty Matlock, tenor saxophonist/clarinetist Pud Brown and cornetist Pete Daily. Ash's sessions resulted in a suite for Decca Records entitled New Orleans at Midnight.

Ash found employment in the Walt Disney Studios music department playing for movie and television soundtracks, acting as the resident arranger and pianist for the Mickey Mouse Club, and performing with Firehouse Five Plus Two member and Disney musical director George Bruns and his Wonderland Jazz Band. He frequently performed with Bruns' group or with his own small ensemble at Disneyland.

=== Retirement ===
After his retirement from Disney in the mid-1960s, Ash spent his last few years playing vintage jazz, stride, and ragtime in the cocktail lounge of a large bowling alley in Los Angeles. He continued to be hired for special appearances until his death. He died in 1974 at age 59.
