= Jeff Andra =

American baseball player

- Pitcher
- Born: September 9, 1975 (age 50); Shawnee, Kansas
- Bats: Left Throws: Left
- Stats at Baseball Reference

Teams
- Sinon Bulls (2003–2005)

Jeffrey Louis Andra (born September 9, 1975) is a former professional baseball pitcher.

== Career ==
After being named Gatorade's Kansas high school baseball Player of the Year in 1994, Andra attended the University of Oklahoma, where he played for the Oklahoma Sooners baseball team. In 1996, he played collegiate summer baseball with the Wareham Gatemen of the Cape Cod Baseball League. He was drafted by the San Francisco Giants in the 3rd round of the 1997 Major League Baseball draft.

Andra played in the Giants organization through 2001. He played for the Elmira Pioneers of the independent Northern League in 2002 and for the Sinon Bulls of the Chinese Professional Baseball League from 2003 through 2005.
