= List of people from Johnson County, Kansas =

The following is a list of people from Johnson County, Kansas. Inclusion on the list is reserved for notable people who have resided in the rural county area or in smaller cities such as Leawood, Prairie Village, Stilwell, or De Soto. For residents of the more populous Olathe and Overland Park, see list of people from Olathe, Kansas and list of people from Overland Park, Kansas.

== List of people ==
- Stanley T. Adams (De Soto)
- John Anderson, Jr.
- Jeff Andra
- John Henry Balch
- Robert Frederick Bennett (Prairie Village)
- Lee Rogers Berger
- Matt Besler
- Terry Bivins
- Blair Butler
- John D. Carmack
- Stevie Case
- Johnny Dare
- Joyce DiDonato (Prairie Village)
- Dave Doeren
- Bart Evans
- Holley Fain (Leawood)
- Donald Fehr (Prairie Village)
- Jeffrey L. Fisher (Leawood)
- Catherine Fox
- Thomas Frank
- Matt Freije
- Matt Fulks
- Julie Garwood (Leawood)
- Lawrence Gates
- Howard K. Gloyd (De Soto)
- Matt Gogel
- Brian Gordon (Westwood)
- Debora Green (Prairie Village)
- Donald J. Hall, Sr.
- George H. Hodges
- Jennifer Hopkins
- Nick Jordan
- Jen Kao
- Steve Lacy
- Frank H. Lee (De Soto)
- Dave Lindstrom
- Steve Little
- Ashley Litton
- Eric Lynch
- Karen McCarthy (Leawood)
- Harold "Jug" McSpaden
- Candice Millard (Leawood)
- Dennis Moore
- Richard Myers
- Philip Nelson
- John H. Outland
- Ramesh Ponnuru (Prairie Village)
- Trevor Releford
- Rob Riggle
- Jim Roth (Prairie Village)
- Paul Rudd
- Paul Shirley
- Max Shortell
- Bubba Starling
- Michael Stevens (Youtuber) (Stilwell)
- Michael R. Strain
- William B. Strang Jr.
- Jason Sudeikis
- Paul Turner
- Russell R. Waesche (Leawood)
- Kay Wolf (Prairie Village)
- David Wysong

== See also ==
- Lists of people from Kansas
