= Damian Johnson (American football) =

American football player (1962–2026)

No. 68
- Position: Offensive lineman

Personal information
- Born: December 18, 1962; Great Bend, Kansas, U.S.
- Died: November 5, 2026 (aged 63)
- Listed height: 6 ft 5 in (1.96 m)
- Listed weight: 290 lb (132 kg)

Career information
- High school: Great Bend
- College: Kansas State
- NFL draft: 1986: undrafted

Career history
- New York Giants (1986–1989); New England Patriots (1990)

Awards and highlights
- Super Bowl champion (XXI); Second-team All-Big Eight (1984)

Career NFL statistics
- Games played: 54
- Games started: 33
- Stats at Pro Football Reference

Damian Curtis Johnson (December 18, 1962 – November 5, 2026) was an American professional football player who was an offensive lineman for five seasons with the New York Giants and the New England Patriots of the National Football League (NFL). He played college football for the Kansas State Wildcats.

Johnson was convicted of theft in April 2009 in a New Jersey court. Sonita Johnson, had testified her husband simply came home one day and told her the Mercedes she leased for his use had been stolen.

He owned and operated a transportation company in Michigan known as Giant Transportation.

Johnson died November 5, 2026, at the age of 63.
