= Robert Courtney (fraudster) =

American fraudster (born 1952)

- Born: Robert Ray Courtney; September 15, 1952 (age 74); Hays, Kansas, U.S.
- Education: University of Missouri-Kansas City
- Occupation: Former pharmacist
- Criminal charges: Tampering with drugs, adulteration or mislabeling of drugs
- Criminal penalty: 30 years in prison, $25,000 fine, $10.4 million restitution
- Criminal status: February 27, 2002 (pleaded guilty), Incarcerated at FCI Englewood
- Spouse
- Children: 5

Robert Ray Courtney (born September 15, 1952) is an American former pharmacist from Kansas City, Missouri. In 2002, after initially being caught diluting several doses of chemotherapy drugs, he pleaded guilty to intentionally diluting 98,000 prescriptions involving multiple types of drugs, which were given to 4,200 patients, and was sentenced to 30 years in federal prison.

== Early life and education ==
Courtney was born in Hays, Kansas. His father was a traveling minister based in Scott City, and described Robert as an "ideal son". He played the trombone at Wichita South High School. Courtney graduated from the School of Pharmacy at University of Missouri–Kansas City in 1975.

== Adult life ==
In 1986, Courtney became the owner of Research Medical Tower Pharmacy in Kansas City, where he had worked since 1975. He primarily mixed intravenous drugs. Before his arrest, Courtney served as a deacon at Northland Cathedral, an Assemblies of God megachurch in Kansas City.

In 1992, he and his first wife divorced. Courtney retained custody of their two daughters. His second marriage lasted four or five days and was later annulled. In 1994, his third wife, Laura Courtney, gave birth to twins. In August 2001, the same month he was arrested, the total value of Courtney's assets was $18.7 million.

== Dilution fraud ==
In 1990, Courtney began purchasing pharmaceuticals on the gray market and using them to fill prescriptions at his pharmacy. In time he began diluting prescriptions to increase profits. Both practices were illegal.

In 1998, Eli Lilly sales representative Darryl Ashley noticed Courtney was selling three times the amount that he had bought of the cancer drug Gemzar. Eli Lilly initiated an internal investigation but found no evidence of illegality and closed the investigation without further action.

In early 2001, several nurses in the office of Dr. Verda Hunter (now Hicks), an oncologist in Courtney's building, noticed that several of Hunter's patients were not experiencing the debilitating side effects that are normally the case with chemotherapy regimens. They voiced their concerns to Ashley, who casually mentioned the 1998 investigation. Ashley wondered if Hunter's patients were actually getting the full prescribed dose. When he reviewed the utilization records, he discovered the same problem that he had seen in 1998; Courtney appeared to be selling Gemzar for $20 per vial less than the drug was worth on the market, appearing to take a substantial loss. Combined with the lack of side effects, it led Ashley to suspect that Courtney might be diluting the drugs. Ashley said years later that if he were right, Courtney was committing "a hideous crime".

Hunter also noticed that many of her patients were only suffering mild side effects, and their condition did not seem to be improving. When Hunter learned of the conversation with Ashley, Hunter had a medication that had been supplied by Courtney sent for testing. The results showed that the sample contained less than one-third of the drug prescribed. Upon receiving the test results back, Hunter immediately cut ties with Courtney and notified the FBI.

=== Investigation ===
Investigators with the FBI and FDA initially did not believe that a pharmacist would do something so egregious. They initially hoped there was an innocent explanation. However, when Hunter showed them the test results, they realized that she was telling the truth.

Even with damning evidence that Courtney was diluting drugs, federal prosecutors asked the FBI and FDA to establish a chain of custody in order to get probable cause for an arrest. Prosecutors believed that since there were other pharmacists in the building, they needed to tie any diluted drugs directly to Courtney, and prove beyond reasonable doubt that he was the only one who was diluting drugs. With this in mind, investigators persuaded Hunter to help them in a sting operation by obtaining additional medication from Courtney.

On August 7 and 8, Hunter gave Courtney several prescriptions for fictitious patients. Courtney mixed the drugs, initialed the infusion bags, and personally took them to Hunter's office. Federal agents had them tested at the FDA's forensic chemistry lab on August 7 and 8. The samples contained a fraction of the prescribed dosage. Tests from the 7th contained as little as 17 percent, and at most 39 percent. Tests from the 8th contained less than 30 percent of the prescribed dosage, and in some cases contained no detectable chemotherapy at all. According to the FBI, patients who did not get any active chemotherapy were essentially receiving saline solution.

Investigators believed that Courtney took a base dose of chemotherapy drugs and split it between three prescriptions, then sold them to oncologists for the same price as a full dose. He took advantage of the fact that oncologists are usually concerned mainly with chemotherapy's effects on the body, not the amount of the dose. While he was supposed to prepare infusions with $3,000 worth of chemotherapy drugs, the solutions he prepared were equivalent to only $700, turning a significant profit.

=== Arrest ===
On August 13, 2001, federal agents raided Research Medical Tower Pharmacy. They told Courtney that they were investigating a pharmacist, and needed to get information about who prepared the chemo infusions for Hunter's patients. Courtney acknowledged that he had prepared them and thus revealed himself to be the person who diluted the drugs. The following day, federal agents told Courtney that he was the target of the investigation, and shut his pharmacy down. Courtney surrendered to authorities on the 15th and was initially charged with one count of adulterating and misbranding drugs. Courtney was indicted on the 23rd with 20 counts of tampering with consumer products and adulterating and misbranding drugs.

Investigators reported that before turning himself in, Courtney gave $80,000 in cash, and more than 100 doses of Prozac to his wife.

The FBI urged anyone who had ever received chemotherapy infusions from Courtney to come forward.

Faced with the mounting evidence, Courtney gave investigators a list of three medications that he diluted, and a list of 34 affected patients. He claimed to have only started diluting drugs a few months ago. He openly admitted he did it to pay off a $1 million donation to the Northland Cathedral building fund.

Many patients and survivors wanted him charged with murder, as did federal investigators. While the FBI and FDA believed he was essentially a serial killer, federal prosecutors believed a murder charge would be hard to prove, since many patients were suffering from late-stage cancer. Additionally, oncology experts told the FBI that there was no way to prove beyond reasonable doubt that the diluted chemotherapy directly contributed to patients dying.

Courtney also was named as a defendant in approximately 300 suits for fraud and wrongful death. In one case a jury awarded the plaintiff, Georgia Hayes, a total of $2.2 billion in damages. Although Hayes knew she would likely never see that money because his assets had been frozen, she wanted to send a message that this type of deceit was not worth the cost.

Eli Lilly and Bristol Myers-Squibb were named in several of the civil suits. Eli Lilly ultimately settled the suits for $48 million. Bristol Myers-Squibb paid $24 million.

=== Plea deal and sentencing ===
Facing the prospect of life in prison if convicted at trial, on February 20, 2002, Courtney pleaded guilty to 20 federal counts of tampering and adulterating the chemotherapy drugs Taxol and Gemzar. He also acknowledged that he and his corporation, Courtney Pharmacy Inc., had weakened drugs, conspired to traffic in stolen drugs and caused the filing of false Medicare claims. Prosecutors sought a plea deal because they believed it was the only way to get to the bottom of his scheme.

According to law enforcement estimates, as well as his own confession, from 1992 to 2001, Courtney diluted 98,000 prescriptions from 400 doctors, which were given to 4,200 patients. Courtney admitted to diluting 72 different kinds of drugs. Besides chemotherapy treatments, he admitted diluting medications for diabetes and AIDS patients, as well as fertility treatments. He subsequently admitted that he had been diluting drugs for his entire career. As he put it, "whatever I could dilute, I did dilute". Over the course of his career, he earned over $19 million, a figure that FBI agent Melissa Osborne called "blood money". On December 5, 2002, Courtney was sentenced to 30 years in federal prison.

=== Prison life ===
Courtney started his sentence at Gilmer Federal Correctional Institution near Glenville, West Virginia before being transferred to Englewood Federal Correctional Institution near Littleton, Colorado. His projected release date was on May 2, 2026, when he would be 74 years old.

In July 2020, Courtney was considered for early release, due to the COVID-19 pandemic. He would have served the remainder of his sentence on house arrest in Trimble, Missouri. In his request for early release, Courtney cited numerous health issues, such as a stroke and hypertension. Amid a community and bipartisan outcry, federal judge Ortrie D. Smith turned the request down on September 1, 2020, saying that Courtney's crimes were "vastly different" than was normally the case for defendants seeking compassionate release.

In spring 2024, victims and their families received a notice that Courtney would be released to a Community Corrections Center, or halfway house, in Springfield, Missouri, on June 20, 2024. He was released to home confinement on August 1, 2024, despite criticism from lawmakers and victims' families. On May 2, 2026, Courtney was released from home confinement to serve the remaining five years of his sentence on supervised probation.

=== Popular culture ===
The Law & Order: Criminal Intent second season episode 6 from November 2002, Malignant, is a fictional story based in large part on Courtney's case.

In 2008, an episode of American Greed entitled "Deadly Rx For Greed" recounted Courtney's crimes, trial and conviction. In 2020, an episode of Oxygen's License to Kill, entitled "Deadly Pharmacist", also chronicled Courtney's misdeeds.

== See also ==
- Counterfeit medications
