= Johnny Carver (sports author) =

American sports author

Jonathan Richard Carver (born October 6, 1995) is an American sports author and basketball analytics contributor, best known for his book Ranketology: A New Way of Determining Basketball's Greatest Player.

== Biography ==
Carver was born in Shawnee, Kansas, the son of Bradley and Liza Carver. Carver graduated from Olathe Northwest High School in 2014 after previously attending Shawnee Mission Northwest High School. His father played basketball at Shawnee Mission Northwest High School, where he broke the school's scoring record. He went on to play college basketball for Kansas State University in the 1980s. His brother, Steve, broke his father's record at the same high school and played college basketball at the College of the Holy Cross.

Carver has struggled with health complications, and has been hospitalized frequently with ulcerative colitis, which caused him to quit basketball prior to his senior year of high school. In college, he worked for the Arkansas Razorbacks Men's Basketball Team helping with basketball analytics. He served as a basketball operations intern for the Indiana Pacers in the summer of 2016. He graduated from the Sam M. Walton College of Business in 2017. He is currently a law student at the University of Miami School of Law.

== Ranketology: A New Way of Determining Basketball's Greatest Player ==
Ranketology: A New Way of Determining Basketball's Greatest Player released in January 2015, when Carver was a freshman at the University of Arkansas. The book is based primarily on an algorithm that he created to determine the best player in NBA history. He began writing the book in high school after he lost his playing career to ulcerative colitis. The book was publicly praised by former Arkansas Razorback player Scotty Thurman, and was covered by many local and national media outlets.
