= List of Washburn Ichabods football seasons =

This is a list of Washburn Ichabods football season records. The Washburn Ichabods football team is the football team of Washburn University, located in the American city of[Topeka, Kansas]. The team competes as a Mid-America Intercollegiate Athletics Association (MIAA) at the NCAA Division II level.

When the program began in 1891, the team did not have a nickname. That changed however, in 1904 when "Sons of the Ichabod nickname was printed in the first edition of The Kaw yearbook. Since 1928, Washburn football has played in Yager Stadium at Moore Bowl, named after former Washburn running back, Gary Yager.

Washburn has won 12 conference championships: four in the Kansas Conference, six in the Central Intercollegiate Athletic Conference, one in the Central States Intercollegiate Conference, and one in the Mid-America Intercollegiate Athletics Association.

== Seasons ==
As of 2025, the records are up–to–date.

Year	Coach	Overall	Conference	Standing	Bowl/playoffs	Coaches^{#}	AP^{°}
Unknown Coach (Kansas Conference) (1891–1893)
1891	Unknown coach	1–4–0					
1892	Unknown coach	0–2–0					
1893	Unknown coach	1–0–0					
W. M. Gains (Kansas Conference) (1894)
1894	W. M. Gains	3–1–0					
No Records of games () (1895)
W. Griffith (Kansas Conference) (1896)
1896	No coach	6–1–1					
Paul Coldren (Kansas Conference) (1897–1898)
1897	Paul Coldren	7–1–0					
1898	Paul Coldren	4–0–1					
William Melford (Kansas Conference) (1899)
1899	William Melford	2–5–1					
Bennie Owen (Kansas Conference) (1900)
1900	Bennie Owen	6–2–0					
Lawrence Banks (Kansas Conference) (1901)
1901	Lawrence Banks	3–2–3					
H. Ward Page (Kansas Conference) (1902)
1902	H. Ward Page	3–4–0					
A. R. Kennedy (Kansas Conference) (1903)
1903	A. R. Kennedy	7–0–1	4–0–1				
John H. Outland (Kansas Conference) (1904–1905)
1904	John H. Outland	7–2–0					
1905	John H. Outland	7–3–1					
Garfield Weede (Kansas Conference) (1906–1908)
1906	Garfield Weede	8–1–3					
1907	Garfield Weede	8–0–0	5–0–0				
1908	Garfield Weede	4–5–1					
Robert Stewart (Kansas Conference) (1909–1910)
1909	Robert Stewart	4–4–0					
1910	William L. Driver	4–4–0					
William L. Driver (Kansas Conference) (1911–1912)
1911	William L. Driver	3–5–1					
1912	William L. Driver	4–4–0					
Glen Gray (Kansas Conference) (1913–1915)
1913	Glen Gray	3–2–2					
1914	Glen Gray	5–3–0					
1915	Glen Gray	2–5–1					
A. R. Kennedy (Kansas Conference) (1916–1917)
1916	A. R. Kennedy	3–6–0					
1917	A. R. Kennedy	2–6–2					
Ernest Bearg (Kansas Conference) (1918–1919)
1918	Ernest Bearg	4–1–0					
1919	Ernest Bearg	7–1–1					
Dwight Ream (Kansas Conference) (1920–1921)
1920	Dwight Ream	5–2–3					
1921	Dwight Ream	3–5–1					
Glenn D. Vosburg (Kansas Conference) (1922)
1922	Glenn D. Vosburg	1–7–0					
George Woodward (Kansas Conference) (1923–1926)
1923	George Woodward	0–8–2					
1924	George Woodward	2–7–0					
1925	George Woodward	2–4–1					
1926	George Woodward	3–4–1					
Roy Wynne (Kansas Conference) (1927–1928)
1927	Roy Wynne	1–7–0					
Central Intercollegiate Athletic Conference
1928	Roy Wynne	2–7–0					
Ernest Bearg (Central Intercollegiate Athletic Conference) (1929–1935)
1929	Ernest Bearg	5–6–0					
1930	Ernest Bearg	7–2–0					
1931	Ernest Bearg	7–3–0					
1932	Ernest Bearg	6–3–1					
1933	Ernest Bearg	4–6–1					
1934	Ernest Bearg	2–6–1					
Missouri Valley Conference
1935	Ernest Bearg	4–6–0					
Elmer Holm (Missouri Valley Conference) (1936–1941)
1936	Elmer Holm	2–6–1					
1937	Elmer Holm	0–10–0					
1938	Elmer Holm	6–3–0					
1939	Elmer Holm	6–4–0					
1940	Elmer Holm	4–6–0					
Central Intercollegiate Athletic Conference
1941	Elmer Holm	5–2–2					
Bob Raugh (Central Intercollegiate Athletic Conference) (1942–1943)
1942	Bob Raugh	1–6–0					
1943	Bob Raugh	2–4–2					
Dee Errikson (Central Intercollegiate Athletic Conference) (1944)
1944	Dee Errikson	1–6–0					
Lew Lane (Central Intercollegiate Athletic Conference) (1945)
1945	Lew Lane	3–1–0					
Dick Godlove (Central Intercollegiate Athletic Conference) (1946–1958)
1946	Dick Godlove	6–2–1					
1947	Dick Godlove	7–1–0					
1948	Dick Godlove	3–5–1					
1949	Dick Godlove	7–2–0					
1950	Dick Godlove	3–4–1					
1951	Dick Godlove	6–3–0					
1952	Dick Godlove	4–5–0					
1953	Dick Godlove	7–1–0					
1954	Dick Godlove	6–2–0					
1955	Dick Godlove	6–2–1					
1956	Dick Godlove	3–6–0					
1957	Dick Godlove	5–4–0					
1958	Dick Godlove	4–5–0					
Ralph Brown (Central Intercollegiate Athletic Conference) (1959–1961)
1959	Ralph Brown	3–6–0					
1960	Ralph Brown	3–6–0					
1961	Ralph Brown	3–6–0	1–4–0				
Ellis Rainsberger (Central Intercollegiate Athletic Conference) (1962–1964)
1962	Ellis Rainsberger	5–4–0	2–3–0				
1963	Ellis Rainsberger	5–4–0	2–2–0				
1964	Ellis Rainsberger	8–1–0	4–0–0				
Ed Linta (Central Intercollegiate Athletic Conference) (1965–1966)
1965	Ed Linta	2–6–1	1–3–0				
1966	Ed Linta	2–7–0	1–3–0				
Bill Schaake (Central Intercollegiate Athletic Conference) (1967–1968)
1967	Bill Schaake	0–9–0	0–4–0				
1968	Bill Schaake	2–7–0	1–3–0				
Rocky Mountain Athletic Conference
Harold Elliott (Rocky Mountain Athletic Conference) (1969–1970)
1969	Harold Elliott	5–5–0	3–3–0				
1970	Harold Elliott	5–3–2					
Great Plains Athletic Conference
Bob Noblitt (Great Plains Athletic Conference) (1971–1973)
1971	Bob Noblitt	5–5–0					
1972	Bob Noblitt	4–6–0					
1973	Bob Noblitt	3–6–1					
Larry Elliott (Great Plains Athletic Conference) (1974–1978)
1974	Larry Elliott	8–3–0	3–2–0		W Boot Hill Bowl		
1975	Larry Elliott	5–5–0	2–3–0		L Boot Hill Bowl		
Central States Intercollegiate Conference
1976	Larry Elliott	6–4–0	4–2–0				
1977	Larry Elliott	6–3–1	4–2–1				
1978	Larry Elliott	3–7–0	4–6–0				
Gary Hampton (Central States Intercollegiate Conference) (1979–1980)
1979	Gary Hampton	4–6–0	2–5–0				
1980	Gary Hampton	2–8–0	1–6–0				
Glenn Jagodzinske (Central States Intercollegiate Conference) (1981–1982)
1981	Glenn Jagodzinske	3–7–0	3–4–0				
1982	Glenn Jagodzinske	1–9–0	1–6–0				
George Tardiff (Central States Intercollegiate Conference) (1983–1984)
1983	George Tardiff	8–2–0	6–1–0				
1984	George Tardiff/Larry Elliott	2–8–0	2–5–0				
Larry Elliott (Central States Intercollegiate Conference) (1985–1989)
1985	Larry Elliott	4–7–0	2–5–0				
1986	Larry Elliott	8–3–0	5–2–0		W Aztec Bowl		
1987	Larry Elliott	6–5–0	5–2–0		L NAIA First Round		
1988	Larry Elliott	7–4–0	5–2–0				
Missouri/Mid-America Intercollegiate Athletics Association
1989	Larry Elliott	3–7–0	3–7–0				
Dennis Caryl (Mid-America Intercollegiate Athletics Association) (1990–1993)
1990	Dennis Caryl	4–6–0	4–5–0				
1991	Dennis Caryl	1–10–0	1–8–0				
1992	Dennis Caryl	2–8–0	2–7–0				
1993	Dennis Caryl/Andy Williams	0–10–0	0–9–0				
Tony DeMeo (Mid-America Intercollegiate Athletics Association) (1994–2001)
1994	Tony DeMeo	2–8–0	2–7				
1995	Tony DeMeo	4–6–0	3–6				
1996	Tony DeMeo	4–6	4–5				
1997	Tony DeMeo	3–8	2–7				
1998	Tony DeMeo	4–7	3–6				
1999	Tony DeMeo	6–5	4–5				
2000	Tony DeMeo	5–6	3–6				
2001	Tony DeMeo	3–8	3–6				
Craig Schurig (Mid-America Intercollegiate Athletics Association) (2002–2024)
2002	Craig Schurig	3–8	3–6	T–6th			
2003	Craig Schurig	5–6	3–6	7th			
2004	Craig Schurig	8–4	6–3	3rd	W Mineral Water Bowl		
2005	Craig Schurig	9–3	7–1	1st	L NCAA Division II Second Round	13	
2006	Craig Schurig	7–4	6–3	4th			
2007	Craig Schurig	8–4	7–2	2nd		24	
2008	Craig Schurig	6–5	4–5	6th			
2009	Craig Schurig	8–3	6–3	2nd		25	
2010	Craig Schurig	8–4	6–3	3rd	W Kanza Bowl		
2011	Craig Schurig	10–3	7–2	2nd	L Division II NCAA Second Round	11	
2012	Craig Schurig	7–4	7–4	6th			
2013	Craig Schurig	7–3	7–3	T–4th			
2014	Craig Schurig	4–7	4–7	T–7th			
2015	Craig Schurig	5–6	5–6	8th			
2016	Craig Schurig	7–4	7–4	T–4th	L Mineral Water Bowl		
2017	Craig Schurig	7–5	6–5	T–6th	W Heart Of Texas Bowl		
2018	Craig Schurig	5–6	5–6	T–7th			
2019	Craig Schurig	6–5	6–5	T–5th			
2021	Craig Schurig	9–3	9–2	T–2nd	L Division II NCAA First Round	25	
2022	Craig Schurig	7–4	7–4	5th			
2023	Craig Schurig	1–10	0–10	11th			
2024	Craig Schurig	3–8	2–7	T–8th			
Zach Watkins (Mid-America Intercollegiate Athletics Association) (2025–present)
2025	Zach Watkins	3–8	2–7	T–8th			
Total:		582–624–44					
National championship Conference title Conference division title or championship game berth
^{#}Rankings from final Coaches Poll.
