= List of Washburn Ichabods head football coaches =

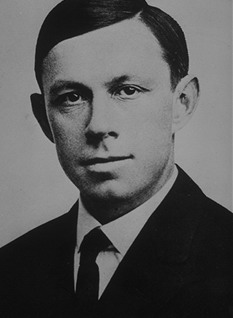
Bennie Owen coached at Washburn for the 1900 season before going to the Bethany Terrible Swedes and later the Oklahoma Sooners. He ended his career with a record of 155–60–19 and was inducted into the College Football Hall of Fame in 1951.

The Washburn Ichabods football program is a college football team that represents Washburn University in the Mid-America Intercollegiate Athletics Association, a part of NCAA Division II. The team has had 41 head coaches since its first recorded football game in 1891. The current coach is Zach Watkins who first took the position for the 2025 season.

== Key ==
Key to symbols in coaches list
General		Overall		Conference		Postseason (Note: Although the first Rose Bowl Game was played in 1902, it has been continuously played since the 1916 game, and is recognized as the oldest bowl game by the NCAA. "—" indicates any season prior to 1916 when postseason games were not played.)	
No.	Order of coaches (Note: A running total of the number of head coaches, with coaches who served separate tenures being counted only once. Interim head coaches are represented with "Int" and are not counted in the running total. "—" indicates the team played but either without a coach or no coach is on record. "X" indicates an interim year without play.)	GC	Games coached	CW	Conference wins	PW	Postseason wins
DC	Division championships	OW	Overall wins	CL	Conference losses	PL	Postseason losses
CC	Conference championships	OL	Overall losses	CT	Conference ties	PT	Postseason ties
NC	National championships	OT	Overall ties (Note: Overtime rules in college football were introduced in 1996, making ties impossible in the period since.)	C%	Conference winning percentage		
†	Elected to the College Football Hall of Fame	O%	Overall winning percentage (Note: When computing the win–loss percentage, a tie counts as half a win and half a loss.)				

== Coaches ==
Statistics correct as of the end of the 2025 college football season.

No.	Name	Term	GC	OW	OL	OT	O%	CW	CL	CT	C%	PW	PL	CCs	NCs	Awards
0	Unknown	1891–1893	10	2	8	0	.200	0	0	0		0	0	0	0	
1	Moses W. Games	1894	5	3	2	0	.600	—	—	—		—	—	—	—	
X	no team	1895	—	—	—	—	—	—	—	—	—	—	—		—	—
2	Walter Griffiths	1896	9	7	1	1	.833	—	—	—		—	—	—	—	
3	Paul Coldren	1897–1898	19	15	3	1	.816	0	0	0		0	0	0	0	
4	William Melford	1899	9	2	5	2	.333	—	—	—		—	—	—	—	
5	Bennie Owen^{†}	1900	8	6	2	0	.750	—	—	—		—	—	—	—	
6	Lawrence Banks	1901	8	2	3	3	.438	—	—	—		—	—	—	—	
7	H. Ward Page	1902	8	3	5	0	.375	—	—	—		—	—	—	—	
8	A. R. Kennedy	1903	8	7	0	1	.938	—	—	—		—	—	—	—	
9	John H. Outland^{†}	1904–1905	20	14	5	1	.725	—	—	—		—	—	—	—	
10	Garfield Weede	1906–1908	32	22	6	4	.750	—	—	—		—	—	1	—	
11	Robert Stewart	1909–1910	16	8	8	0	.500	—	—	—		—	—	—	—	
12	William L. Driver	1911–1912	18	9	8	1	.528	—	—	—		—	—	—	—	
13	Glen Gray	1913–1915	25	11	11	3	.500	—	—	—		—	—	—	—	
14	A. R. Kennedy	1916–1917	19	5	12	2	.316	—	—	—		—	—	—	—	
15	Ernest Bearg	1918–1919	14	11	2	1	.821	—	—	—		—	—	—	—	
16	Dwight Ream	1920–1921	19	7	8	4	.474	—	—	—		—	—	—	—	
17	Glenn D. Vosburg	1922	9	1	7	1	.167	—	—	—		—	—	—	—	
18	George Woodward	1923–1926	34	7	23	4	.265	—	—	—		—	—	—	—	
19	Roy Wynne	1927–1928	17	3	14	0	.176	—	—	—		—	—	—	—	
20	Ernest Bearg	1929–1935	71	37	31	3	.542	—	—	—		—	—	1	—	
21	Elmer Holm	1936–1941	57	23	31	3	.430	—	—	—		—	—	—	—	
22	Bob Raugh	1942–1943	16	3	11	2	.250	—	—	—		—	—	—	—	
23	Dee Errikson	1944	7	1	6	0	.143	—	—	—		—	—	—	—	
24	Lew Lane	1945	6	4	2	0	.667	—	—	—		—	—	—	—	
25	Dick Godlove	1946–1958	26	16	8	2	.654	—	—	—		—	—	3	—	
26	Ralph Brown	1959–1961	27	10	17	0	.370	—	—	—		—	—	—	—	
27	Ellis Rainsberger	1962–1964	27	16	11	0	.593	—	—	—		—	—	1	—	
28	Ed Linta	1965–1966	18	4	13	1	.250	—	—	—		—	—	—	—	
29	Bill Schaake	1967–1968	18	2	16	0	.111	—	—	—		—	—	—	—	
30	Harold Elliott	1969–1970	20	10	8	2	.550	—	—	—		—	—	—	—	
31	Bob Noblitt	1971–1973	30	11	18	1	.383	—	—	—		—	—	—	—	
32	Larry Elliott	1974–1978	51	29	21	1	.578	—	—	—		1	1	—	—	
33	Gary Hampton	1979–1980	20	6	14	0	.300	—	—	—		—	—	—	—	
34	Glenn Jagodzinske	1981–1982	20	4	16	0	.200	—	—	—		—	—	—	—	
35	George Tardiff	1983–1984	20	10	10	0	.500	—	—	—		—	—	1	—	
36	Larry Elliott	1984–1989	65	23	42	0	.354	—	—	—		—	1	—	—	
37	Dennis Caryl	1990–1993	39	7	32	0	.179	—	—	—		—	—	—	—	
38	Andy Williams	1993	2	0	2	0	.000	—	—	—		—	—	—	—	
39	Tony DeMeo	1994–2001	85	32	53	0	.376	—	—	—	—	—	—	—	—	
40	Craig Schurig	2002–2024	251	141	110	0	.562	120	97	—	.553	1	4	1	—	
41	Zach Watkins	2025–present	11	3	8	0	.273	2	7	—	.222	0	0	0	—	

== See also ==
- List of people from Topeka, Kansas
- List of Washburn University alumni
