= Larry Elliott (American football) =

American football and baseball coach (1935–2008)

Biographical details
- Born: November 9, 1935; La Junta, Colorado, U.S.
- Died: April 13, 2008 (aged 72); Sunrise, Arizona, U.S.

Playing career

Football
- 1954: Kansas State
- 1956–1958: Washburn
- Position: Quarterback

Coaching career (HC unless noted)

Football
- 1966–1973: Washburn (assistant)
- 1974–1978: Washburn
- 1979–1984: Washburn (OC)
- 1984–1989: Washburn

Baseball
- 1967–1979: Washburn

Head coaching record
- Overall: 58–51–1 (football); 188–174 (baseball)
- Bowls: 1–1
- Tournaments: 0–2 (NAIA D-I playoffs)

Larry A. Elliott (November 9, 1935 – April 13, 2008) was an American football and baseball coach. He was the 32nd and 36th head football coach for Washburn University in Topeka, Kansas. He held that position for five seasons, from 1974 until 1978 and then returned for six more seasons, from 1984 until 1989. His overall coaching record at Washburn was 58 wins, 51 losses, and 1 tie.

Elliott led the Ichabods to a victory in the 1974 Boot Hill Bowl over Millikin University, the school's first post-season football appearance. In 1986, he was named to Washburn's Athletic Hall of Fame.

Elliott played one season of Minor League Baseball for the Hornell Dodgers in 1955 before attending Washburn as a student. He was later inducted into the Kansas Softball Hall of Fame.

Elliott died in 2008. In 2019, Elliott and his son Mark, who also played at Washburn and in the minors, were inducted into the Shawnee County Baseball Hall of Fame.

== Head coaching record ==
=== Football ===
Year	Team	Overall	Conference	Standing	Bowl/playoffs
Washburn Ichabods (Great Plains Athletic Conference) (1974–1975)
1974	Washburn	8–3	3–2	3rd	W Boot Hill
1975	Washburn	5–5	2–3	T–4th	
Washburn Ichabods (Central States Intercollegiate Conference) (1976–1978)
1976	Washburn	6–4	4–2	4th	L Boot Hill
1977	Washburn	6–3–1	4–2–1	T–3rd	
1978	Washburn	3–7	4–6	T–7th	
Washburn Ichabods (Central States Intercollegiate Conference) (1984–1988)
1984	Washburn	2–3 (Note: George Tardiff resigned after the first give games of the 1984 season after leading Washburn to a record of 0–5 with two losses coming in conference play. Elliott replaced Tardiff as head coach for the final five games of the season. The Ichabods finished 2–8 overall and 2–5 in Central States Intercollegiate Conference play.)	2–3	T–6th	
1985	Washburn	4–7	2–5	7th	
1986	Washburn	8–3	5–2	T–2nd	L NAIA Quarterfinal
1987	Washburn	6–5	5–2	2nd	
1988	Washburn	7–4	5–2	T–2nd	L NAIA First Round
Washburn Ichabods (Mid-America Intercollegiate Athletics Association) (1989)
1989	Washburn	3–7	3–7	9th	
Washburn:		58–51–1	40–36–1		
Total:		58–51–1			
