= Washburn Ichabods men's basketball =

- University: Washburn University
- First season: 1905–06
- Head coach: Brett Ballard (8th season)
- Location: Topeka, Kansas
- Arena: Lee Arena (capacity: 4,150)
- Conference: The MIAA
- Nickname: Ichabods
- Colors: Yale blue and white
- All-time record: 1,622–1,097–2 (.596)

NCAA Division I tournament runner-up
- 2001
Other NCAA Division I tournament results
Final Four	1994, 2001, 2025
Elite Eight	1993, 1994, 2001, 2025
Sweet Sixteen	1993, 1994, 2001, 2025
Appearances	1992, 1993, 1994, 1995, 1997, 2000, 2001, 2003, 2004, 2005, 2011, 2012, 2025

NAIA tournament champions
- 1987
Other NAIA tournament results
Semifinals	1987
Quarterfinals	1987
Appearances	1987

Conference tournament champions
- Central States Intercollegiate Conference; 1982, 1983, 1984 Mid-America Intercollegiate Athletics Association; 2005, 2007, 2009, 2013, 2021

Conference regular-season champions
- Kansas Conference; 1909, 1924, 1925 Central Intercollegiate Athletic Conference; 1928, 1950, 1951, 1966, 1967 Great Plains Athletic Conference; 1973 Central States Intercollegiate Conference; 1978, 1986, 1987 Mid-America Intercollegiate Athletics Association; 1991, 1992, 1993, 1994, 1996, 2000, 2002, 2003, 2004, 2011, 2025

Uniforms
Home	Away

The Washburn Ichabods men's basketball team represents Washburn University in Topeka, Kansas, in the NCAA Division II men's basketball competition. The team is currently coached by Brett Ballard, who is in his eighth year at the helm. Ballard replaced Bob Chipman, who retired after the 2016–17 season. The Ichabods currently compete in the Mid-America Intercollegiate Athletics Association (MIAA). The basketball team plays its home games in Lee Arena on campus.

== Overview ==
Washburn annually plays a thirty-game conference schedule that is preceded by an out-of-conference schedule that includes three exhibition games. The conference schedule consists of playing every MIAA member at least once, some twice.

== History ==
Washburn's basketball program began in with the 1905–06 season, forty years after the university was founded. Overall, the team has won 21 conference championships and one national title.

=== The beginning: 1905–1921 ===
Beginning with the 1905–06 season, the program's first, Harry C. Byrd was chosen to lead the program. In his first four seasons as head coach, Byrd led the Ichabods to winning records and a total of 31–20. In 1909–10 season, Byrd led the Ichabods their first conference championship. In Byrd's 16 years as head coach, he led the team to nine winning seasons and seven losing seasons, compiling a record of 116–112–1.

Record table
The beginning: 1905–1921 — Year-by-Year Record
Season	Team	Overall	Conference	Standing	Postseason
Harry C. Byrd (Kansas Conference) (1905–1921)
1905–06	Harry C. Byrd	9–7			
1906–07	Harry C. Byrd	10–5			
1907–08	Harry C. Byrd	3–2			
1908–09	Harry C. Byrd	9–6			
1909–10	Harry C. Byrd	4–6			
1910–11	Harry C. Byrd	10–5–1			
1911–12	Harry C. Byrd	6–13			
1912–13	Harry C. Byrd	6–8			
1913–14	Harry C. Byrd	9–2			
1914–15	Harry C. Byrd	5–6			
1915–16	Harry C. Byrd	5–15			
1916–17	Harry C. Byrd	5–10			
1917–18	Harry C. Byrd	2–9			
1918–19	Harry C. Byrd	9–5			
1919–20	Harry C. Byrd	12–4			
1920–21	Harry C. Byrd	12–9			
Total:		116–112–1			
National champion Postseason invitational champion Conference regular season champion Conference regular season and conference tournament champion Division regular season champion Division regular season and conference tournament champion Conference tournament champion

=== A new era: two new conferences (1921–1946) ===
In 1921, Dwight Ream took over the program for one season. After Ream left with an 8–9 record, Mike Vosburg took over for the 1922–23 season. Vosburg left with a 7–11 record. After two years with two different coaches, McPherson College coach, Dutch Lonborg, became head coach. From 1923 to 1927, Lonborg led the Ichabods to a 61–14–1 record, producing the second, and last, of the team's two ties as well as winning two conference regular season championships. Lonborg is a member of the Naismith Memorial Basketball Hall of Fame.

When Lonborg left after the 1926–27 season, Washburn entered a new era: Roy Wynne was named head coach, and the school joined the newly created Central Intercollegiate Athletic Conference. During Wynne's three seasons as head coach, he produced a 29–22 record. Following Wynne's departure, McPherson's football coach, George Gardner, took over. Coaching for three seasons and a total record of 19–28, Gardner was fired and was replaced by Elmer Holm. Holm's first season was a losing season and the last year in the CIAC. In 1934, Washburn moved joined the Missouri Valley Conference. Holm led the team for two more seasons, ending with a record of 21–36. In 1936, Dee Errikson took over team, leading for the next ten seasons and through World War II. Errikson led the team to an overall record of 67–122, making him one of the most unsuccessful coaches in Washburn history.

Record table
A new era: two new conferences (1921–1946) — Year-by-Year Record
Season	Team	Overall	Conference	Standing	Postseason
Dwight Ream (Kansas Conference) (1921–1922)
1921–22	Dwight Ream	8–9			
Dwight Ream:		8–9			
Mike Vosburg (Kansas Conference) (1922–1923)
1922–23	Mike Vosburg	7–11			
Mike Vosburg:		7–11			
Dutch Lonborg (Kansas Conference) (1923–1927)
1923–24	Dutch Lonborg	18–4			
1924–25	Dutch Lonborg	19–4			AAU Champions
1925–26	Dutch Lonborg	12–1–1			
1926–27	Dutch Lonborg	12–8			
Dutch Lonborg:		61–14–1			
Roy Wynne (Central Intercollegiate Athletic Conference (CIC)) (1927–1930)
1927–28	Roy Wynne	9–4			
1928–29	Roy Wynne	12–5			
1929–30	Roy Wynne	8–13			
Roy Wynne:		29–22			
George Gardner (CIC) (1930–1933)
1930–31	George Gardner	4–11			
1931–32	George Gardner	7–11			
1932–33	George Gardner	8–6			
George Gardner:		19–28			
Elmer Holm (CIAC/Missouri Valley Conference) (1933–1936)
1933–34	Elmer Holm	7–8			
Missouri Valley Conference
1934–35	Elmer Holm	7–14			
1935–36	Elmer Holm	7–14			
Elmer Holm:		21–36			
Dee Errikson (Missouri Valley Conference) (1936–1946)
1936–37	Dee Errikson	4–17			
1937–38	Dee Errikson	10–13			
1938–39	Dee Errikson	4–18			
1939–40	Dee Errikson	8–8			
1940–41	Dee Errikson	7–13			
1941–42	Dee Errikson	4–13			
1942–43	Dee Errikson	6–16			
No Conference – World War II
1943–44	Dee Errikson	4–10			
1944–45	Dee Errikson	9–7			
1945–46	Dee Errikson	11–7			
Dee Errikson:		67–122			
Total:		443–227			
National champion Postseason invitational champion Conference regular season champion Conference regular season and conference tournament champion Division regular season champion Division regular season and conference tournament champion Conference tournament champion

=== Post-World War II: 1946–1979 ===
For the next thirty years after World War II, the Washburn saw five coaches come and go, with the addition of an interim for three games. In 1946, Washburn rejoined the Central Intercollegiate Athletic Conference after competing in the Missouri Valley for nine seasons and no conference for three during the war. After the war, Washburn hired Topeka High School basketball coach Adrian Miller, for would coach for five seasons. Before Miller took the helm of the team, Washburn went nearly 20 years without a winning season and although Miller went 8–11 overall in his first season, Miller quickly turned the team around in 1947–48 going 15–9. For the next three seasons, Miller led the Ichabods to 10 wins or more. After the 1950–51 season, Miller resigned with a 64–46 record to become an insurance agent.

After Miller resigned, Washburn hired former assistant Marion McDonald, who previously served as assistant coach for Fort Hays Kansas State College.

In 1960, Norm Short took over for the Ichabods for the next six seasons, leading the team to a 46–74 record, with only one winning season. After a 5–20 overall and 2–6 conference record in 1965–66, Short resigned. Short coached at Central Missouri State from 1966 to 1972.

Record table
Post-World War II: 1946–1979 — Year-by-Year Record
Season	Team	Overall	Conference	Standing	Postseason
Adrian Miller (Central Intercollegiate Athletic Conference (CIC)) (1946–1951)
1946–47	Adrian Miller	8–11			
1947–48	Adrian Miller	15–9			
1948–49	Adrian Miller	12–7			
1949–50	Adrian Miller	13–10			
1950–51	Adrian Miller	16–9			
Adrian Miller:		64–46			
Marion McDonald (CIC) (1951–1960)
1951–52	Marion McDonald	17–9			
1952–53	Marion McDonald	13–8			
1953–54	Marion McDonald	15–6			
1954–55	Marion McDonald	11–9			
1955–56	Marion McDonald	14–6	6–4		
1956–57	Marion McDonald	9–10	5–5		
1957–58	Marion McDonald	11–10	6–4		
1958–59	Marion McDonald	9–9	4–6		
1959–60	Marion McDonald	7–8	1–6		
Marion McDonald:		106–69	22–25		
Dick Godlove (interim) (CIC) (1959–1960)
1959–60	Dick Godlove	1–2	1–2		
Dick Godlove:		1–2	1–2		
Norm Short (CIAC) (1960–1966)
1960–61	Norm Short	9–10	5–5		
1961–62	Norm Short	5–11	4–6		
1962–63	Norm Short	6–13	4–6		
1963–64	Norm Short	10–10	2–6		
1965–66	Norm Short	11–10	4–4		
1965–66	Norm Short	5–20	2–6		
Norm Short:		46–74	21–33		
Gordon Stauffer (CIC) (1966–1967)
1966–67	Gordon Stauffer	15–8	6–2		
Gordon Stauffer:		15–8	6–2		
Glenn Cafer (CIC) (1967–1979)
1967–68	Glenn Cafer	18–8	8–0		
Rocky Mountain Athletic Conference
1968–69	Glenn Cafer	20–10			
1969–70	Glenn Cafer	14–11			
1970–71	Glenn Cafer	13–12	5–7		
1971–72	Glenn Cafer	13–12	6–6		
Great Plains Athletic Conference
1972–73	Glenn Cafer	11–14	6–6		
1973–74	Glenn Cafer	17–12	7–3		
1974–75	Glenn Cafer	12–13	2–8		
1975–76	Glenn Cafer	8–17	2–10		
Central States Intercollegiate Conference
1976–77	Glenn Cafer	6–21			
1977–78	Glenn Cafer	19–9	9–5		
1978–79	Glenn Cafer	21–6	10–4		
Glenn Cafer:		172–145	47–49		
Total:		403–349			
National champion Postseason invitational champion Conference regular season champion Conference regular season and conference tournament champion Division regular season champion Division regular season and conference tournament champion Conference tournament champion

=== Bob Chipman era: 1979–2017 ===
In 1979, Washburn assistant head coach Bob Chipman took over the program. During his first five years as head coach, Chipman led the Ichabods to a 105–46 overall record, winning three MIAA tournament championships from 1982 through 1984. Two seasons later, Chipman led the Ichabods to Washburn's first – as well as his first – NAIA basketball championship. The following season, the Ichabods won the conference regular-season championship.

In 1989, the Ichabods made the move from the NAIA to the NCAA Division II, which also meant they would join a new conference: the Missouri Intercollegiate Athletic Association. After joining the MIAA, Chipman led his teams to nine conference regular-season championships, four conference championships, 11 NCAA tournament appearances and a national runner-up in 2001. Chipman retired at the end of the 2016–17 season.

Record table
Bob Chipman era: 1979–2017 — Year-by-Year Record
Season	Team	Overall	Conference	Standing	Postseason
Bob Chipman (CSIC) (1979–2017)
1979–80	Bob Chipman	20–8	10–4		
1980–81	Bob Chipman	21–8	9–5		
1981–82	Bob Chipman	22–9	8–6		
1982–83	Bob Chipman	18–12	8–6		
1983–84	Bob Chipman	24–9	9–5		
1984–85	Bob Chipman	26–9	10–4		
1985–86	Bob Chipman	24–9	9–5		
1986–87	Bob Chipman	35–4	13–1		NAIA National Champions
1987–88	Bob Chipman	27–4	14–0		
1988–89	Bob Chipman	24–9	9–5		
Mid-America Intercollegiate Athletics Association
1989–90	Bob Chipman	20–12	7–9		
1990–91	Bob Chipman	16–13	9–7		
1991–92	Bob Chipman	27–5	12–4		L – NCAA Round of 32
1992–93	Bob Chipman	27–5	13–3		L – NCAA Elite Eight
1993–94	Bob Chipman	29–4	15–1		L – NCAA Final Four
1994–95	Bob Chipman	22–8	13–3		
1995–96	Bob Chipman	16–11	9–7		
1996–97	Bob Chipman	24–9	15–3		L – NCAA Round of 32
1997–98	Bob Chipman	19–9	11–5		
1998–99	Bob Chipman	20–10	11–5		
1999–00	Bob Chipman	23–7	14–4		L – NCAA Round of 32
2000–01	Bob Chipman	29–5	15–3		NCAA National Runners-up
2001–02	Bob Chipman	20–8	12–6		
2002–03	Bob Chipman	26–6	15–3		L – NCAA Round of 32
2003–04	Bob Chipman	27–5	15–3		L – NCAA Round of 32
2004–05	Bob Chipman	24–8	14–4		L – NCAA Opening Round
2005–06	Bob Chipman	10–16	4–12		
2006–07	Bob Chipman	8–19	4–14		
2007–08	Bob Chipman	18–11	9–9		
2008–09	Bob Chipman	16–13	11–9		
2009–10	Bob Chipman	16–14	8–12		
2010–11	Bob Chipman	18–10	15–7		L – NCAA Round of 32
2011–12	Bob Chipman	25–8	15–5		L – NCAA Round of 32
2012–13	Bob Chipman	19–8	12–6		
2013–14	Bob Chipman	17–10	10–9		
2014–15	Bob Chipman	16–16	10–9		
2015–16	Bob Chipman	15–13	11–11		
2016–17	Bob Chipman	20–10	11–8		
Total:		808–353			
National champion Postseason invitational champion Conference regular season champion Conference regular season and conference tournament champion Division regular season champion Division regular season and conference tournament champion Conference tournament champion
