= 1934 Wichita Shockers football team =

American college football season

1934 Wichita Shockers football
- Conference: Central Intercollegiate Conference
- Record: 5–3–1 (2–3 CIC)
- Head coach: Al Gebert (5th season)
- Home stadium: Wichita University Stadium

1934 Central Intercollegiate Conference football standings
	Conf.					Overall
Team	W		L		T	W		L		T
Fort Hays State $	4	–	1	–	0	6	–	2	–	1
Emporia Teachers	3	–	2	–	0	7	–	2	–	0
Pittsburg State	3	–	2	–	0	6	–	3	–	0
Wichita	2	–	3	–	0	5	–	3	–	1
Washburn	2	–	3	–	0	2	–	6	–	1
Southwestern (KS)	1	–	4	–	0	5	–	5	–	0
$ – Conference champion

The 1934 Wichita Shockers football team represented the Municipal University of Wichita—now known as Wichita State University—as a member of the Central Intercollegiate Conference (CIC) during the 1934 college football season. Led by fifth-year head coach Al Gebert, the Shockers compiled an overall record of 5–3–1 record with a mark of 2–3 in conference play, tying for fourth place in the CIC.

== Schedule ==
Date	Time	Opponent	Site	Result	Attendance	Source
September 28		Friends*	Wichita University Stadium; Wichita, KS	W 45–0	4,000	
October 5	8:00 p.m.	Oklahoma City*	Wichita University Stadium; Wichita, KS	W 13–0	7,000	
October 12		at Emporia Teachers	Emporia, KS	W 19–6		
October 19		at Fort Hays State	Lewis Field; Hays, KS	L 7–12		
November 3		at Pittsburg State	Pittsburg, KS	L 7–12		
November 10	2:30 p.m.	Southwestern (KS)^{†}	Wichita University Stadium; Wichita, KS	W 27–0	5,000	
November 17	2:30 p.m.	Gonzaga*	Wichita University Stadium; Wichita, KS	T 0–0	4,000	
November 23	2:30 p.m.	South Dakota State*	Wichita University Stadium; Wichita, KS	W 19–0		
November 29		at Washburn	Topeka, KS	L 0–6	4,000	
*Non-conference game; ^{†}Homecoming; All times are in Central time
