= Brett Ballard =

American college men's basketball coach

Current position
- Title: Head coach
- Team: Washburn
- Conference: The MIAA
- Record: 167–79 (.679)

Biographical details
- Born: February 26, 1980 (age 46); Hutchinson, Kansas, U.S.

Playing career
- 1998–2000: Hutchinson CC
- 2000–2002: Kansas
- Position: Guard

Coaching career (HC unless noted)
- 2003–2004: Kansas (volunteer asst.)
- 2004–2008: Kansas (video coordinator)
- 2008–2010: Kansas (director of operations)
- 2010–2012: Baker
- 2012–2014: Tulsa (assistant)
- 2014–2017: Wake Forest (assistant)
- 2017–present: Washburn

Head coaching record
- Overall: 200–109 (.647)

Accomplishments and honors

Championships
- MIAA regular season (2025); MIAA tournament (2021)

Awards
- KBCA Coach of the Year (2018)

Brett Lee Ballard (born February 26, 1980) is an American college men's basketball coach currently coaching at Washburn University. Prior to his current position, Ballard was an assistant coach at Wake Forest University from 2014 to 2017, and the University of Tulsa from 2012 to 2014. He served as Baker University's head men's basketball coach from 2010 to 2012, and in various positions with the Kansas Jayhawks men's basketball team from 2003 to 2010.

== Early career ==
Ballard, a Hutchinson, Kansas native, attended Hutchinson Community College from 1998 to 2000 where he played basketball. After a two-year stint at Hutchinson, Ballard transferred to the University of Kansas where he played from 2000 to 2002. During the 2001–02 season, Ballard helped the Jayhawks win the Big 12 Conference championship and advance to the NCAA Final Four.

In 2003–04, Bill Self's first season, Ballard remained with the Jayhawks as a volunteer student assistant. In 2004, he was promoted to video coordinator, a position he remained in from 2004 to 2008. From 2008 to 2010 he was Kansas' director of basketball operations.

== Baker University, Tulsa and Wake Forest ==
In March 2010, Ballard was named as Baker University's next men's basketball coach. During his two seasons at Baker, Ballard led the Wildcats to its first Heart of America Athletic Conference basketball tournament appearance since 1997 and first NAIA Tournament in almost 20 years. Ballard finished with a record of 33–30.

After two seasons at Baker, Ballard joined fellow Jayhawk Danny Manning at the University of Tulsa from 2012 to 2014 and then to Wake Forest University from 2014 to 2017.

== Washburn University ==
In April 2017, Ballard was named the next head Washburn Ichabods men's basketball coach, following the retirement of Bob Chipman after 38 years. During his first season as head coach, Ballard led the Ichabods to its first conference tournament title game appearance and NCAA postseason game since 2012. Ballard received the Kansas Basketball Coaches Association Coach of the Year Award for four-year men's college basketball after the 2017–18 season.

== Head coach record ==
Record table
| Season | Team | Overall | Conference | Standing | Postseason |
|---|---|---|---|---|---|
Baker Wildcats (Heart of America Athletic Conference) (2010–2012)
| 2010–11 | Baker | 12–19 | 8–12 | | |
| 2011–12 | Baker | 21–11 | 12–6 | | NAIA First Round |
| Baker: | | 33–30 (.524) | 20–18 (.526) | | |
Washburn Ichabods (Mid-America Intercollegiate Athletics Association) (2017–present)
| 2017–18 | Washburn | 22–10 | 14–5 | 3rd | NCAA DII First Round |
| 2018–19 | Washburn | 24–8 | 15–4 | 2nd | NCAA DII First Round |
| 2019–20 | Washburn | 16–13 | 11–8 | 6th | |
| 2020–21 | Washburn | 20–7 | 16–6 | 2nd | NCAA DII Second Round |
| 2021–22 | Washburn | 22–11 | 16–6 | 4th | NCAA DII Second Round |
| 2022–23 | Washburn | 14–15 | 11–11 | 8th | |
| 2023–24 | Washburn | 19–11 | 14–8 | 4th | |
| 2024–25 | Washburn | 30–4 | 17–2 | 1st | NCAA DII Final Four |
| 2025–26 | Washburn | 31–2 | 18–1 | 1st | NCAA DII First Round |
| Washburn: | | 199–81 (.711) | 132–51 (.721) | | |
| Total: | | 231–111 (.675) | | | |
National champion Postseason invitational champion Conference regular season champion Conference regular season and conference tournament champion Division regular season champion Division regular season and conference tournament champion Conference tournament champion
