= 1932 Wichita Shockers football team =

American college football season

1932 Wichita Shockers football

CIC champion
- Conference: Central Intercollegiate Conference
- Record: 7–2 (5–1 CIC)
- Head coach: Al Gebert (3rd season)

1932 Central Intercollegiate Conference football standings
	Conf.					Overall
Team	W		L		T	W		L		T
Wichita $	5	–	1	–	0	7	–	2	–	0
Pittsburg State	4	–	1	–	1	6	–	1	–	2
Washburn	4	–	1	–	1	6	–	3	–	1
College of Emporia	2	–	3	–	1	2	–	5	–	1
Fort Hays State	2	–	4	–	0	4	–	5	–	0
Southwestern (KS)	1	–	3	–	2	3	–	4	–	2
Emporia Teachers	0	–	5	–	1	2	–	5	–	1
$ – Conference champion

The 1932 Wichita Shockers football team was an American football team that represented Wichita University (now known as Wichita State University) as a member of the Central Intercollegiate Conference (CIC) during the 1932 college football season. In its third season under head coach Al Gebert, the team compiled a 7–2 record.

== Schedule ==
Date	Opponent	Site	Result	Source
September 24	at Kansas State*	Memorial Stadium; Manhattan, KS	L 0–26	
September 30	Friends*	Wichita, KS	W 38–6	
October 7	Phillips*	Wichita, KS	W 26–0	
October 14	at Kansas State Teachers	Stadium Field; Emporia, KS	W 14–0	
October 21	at Pittsburg State	Pittsburg, KS	L 0–12	
October 29	at Fort Hays	Hays, KS	W 19–3	
November 4	Southwestern (KS)	Wichita, KS	W 19–0	
November 11	College of Emporia	Wichita, KS	W 45–7	
November 24	Washburn	Wichita, KS	W 28–7	
*Non-conference game
