= 1949 Washburn Ichabods football team =

American college football season

1949 Washburn Ichabods football

CIC co-champion
- Conference: Central Intercollegiate Conference
- Record: 7–2 (5–1 CIC)
- Head coach: Dick Godlove (4th season)
- Offensive scheme: Single-wing
- Home stadium: Moore Bowl

1949 Central Intercollegiate Conference football standings
	Conf.					Overall
Team	W		L		T	W		L		T
Washburn +	5	–	1	–	0	7	–	2	–	0
Pittsburg State +	5	–	1	–	0	8	–	2	–	1
Emporia State	4	–	2	–	0	6	–	4	–	0
Fort Hays State	4	–	2	–	0	5	–	4	–	0
St. Benedict's	2	–	4	–	0	4	–	5	–	0
Southwestern (KS)	1	–	5	–	0	2	–	7	–	0
Rockhurst	0	–	6	–	0	1	–	9	–	0
+ – Conference co-champions

The 1949 Washburn Ichabods football team represented Washburn University as a member of the Central Intercollegiate Conference (CIC) during the 1949 college football season. Led by fourth-year head coach Dick Godlove, the Ichabods compiled an overall record of 7–2 with a mark of 5–1 in conference play, sharing the CIC title with Pittsburg State. Washurn employed a single-wing formation on offense.

== Schedule ==
Date	Time	Opponent	Site	Result	Attendance	Source
September 16		Doane*	Moore Bowl; Topeka, KS	W 31–13		
September 23		at Northern Illinois*	Dekalb Township High School football field; DeKalb, IL	L 27–40	3,000	
October 1		at Emporia State	Emporia, KS	L 14–19		
October 7	8:00 p.m.	Omaha*	Moore Bowl; Topeka, KS	W 13–6		
October 15		Pittsburg State	Moore Bowl; Topeka, KS	W 27–19		
October 22		at St. Benedict's	Atchison, KS	W 21–6		
October 28		Rockhurst^{†}	Moore Bowl; Topeka, KS	W 60–0		
November 5		Fort Hays State	Moore Bowl; Topeka, KS	W 34–13		
November 11		at Southwestern (KS)	Winfield, KS	W 21–20		
*Non-conference game; ^{†}Homecoming; All times are in Central time
