= Al Gebert =

American football player and coach (1906–1980)

Biographical details
- Born: July 30, 1906
- Died: December 4, 1980 (aged 74)

Playing career
- 1928–1929: Notre Dame
- Position: Quarterback

Coaching career (HC unless noted)
- 1930–1941: Wichita

Administrative career (AD unless noted)
- 1930–1942: Wichita

Head coaching record
- Overall: 68–40–6

Accomplishments and honors

Championships
- As coach: 7× CIC (1931–1933, 1935, 1937–1939); As player: National (1929)

Albert J. Gebert (July 30, 1906 – December 4, 1980) was an American football player and coach. He served as the 16th head football coach at the University of Wichita—now known Wichita State University—in Wichita, Kansas and he held that position for 12 seasons, from 1930 until 1941. His record at Wichita was 68–40–6.

A native of Jacksonville, Illinois, Gebert attended Routt Catholic High School. He played football at the University of Notre Dame under coaching great Knute Rockne and was one of the first coaches to gather upon the announcement of his death. He was named one of Rockne's "Notre Dame All Stars" and played in the final game that Rockne was head coach.

== Head coaching record ==
Year	Team	Overall	Conference	Standing	Bowl/playoffs
Wichita Shockers (Central Intercollegiate Conference) (1930–1939)
1930	Wichita	6–3–1	4–1–1	2nd	
1931	Wichita	7–3	5–1	T–1st	
1932	Wichita	7–2	5–1	1st	
1933	Wichita	8–2	6–0	1st	
1934	Wichita	5–3–1	2–3	T–4th	
1935	Wichita	5–4	3–1	T–1st	
1936	Wichita	4–5	1–3	4th	
1937	Wichita	7–3	4–0	1st	
1938	Wichita	7–2–1	4–0	1st	
1939	Wichita	5–3–2	4–0–1	1st	
Wichita Shockers (Independent) (1940–1941)
1940	Wichita	6–4			
1941	Wichita	1–6–1			
Wichita:		68–40–6	38–10–1		
Total:		68–40–6			
