= Elmer Holm =

American football player and sports coach (1906–1992)

Biographical details
- Born: January 14, 1906; Nebraska, U.S.
- Died: October 8, 1992 (aged 86); Colorado, U.S.

Playing career

Football
- 1926–1928: Nebraska

Basketball
- 1926–1928: Nebraska
- Position: Guard (football)

Coaching career (HC unless noted)

Football
- 1929–1935: Washburn (assistant)
- 1936–1941: Washburn
- 1942: Nebraska (line)

Basketball
- 1929–1933: Washburn (assistant)
- 1933–1936: Washburn

Track and field
- 1929–?: Washburn

Administrative career (AD unless noted)
- 1936–1942: Washburn

Head coaching record
- Overall: 23–31–3 (football); 21–36 (basketball)

Accomplishments and honors

Awards
- First-team All-Big Six (1928); Second-team All-MVC (1927)

Elmer W. Holm (January 14, 1906 – October 8, 1992) was an American football player and coach of football and basketball. He was the 21st head football coach at Washburn University in Topeka, Kansas, serving for six seasons, from 1936 to 1941, and compiling a record of 23–31–3. Holm was also the head basketball coach at Washburn from 1933 to 1936, tallying a mark of 21–36.

Following his tenure at Washburn, Holm spent the 1942 season as an assistant football coach at his alma mater, the University of Nebraska–Lincoln.

== Head coaching record ==
=== Football ===
Year	Team	Overall	Conference	Standing	Bowl/playoffs
Washburn Ichabods (Missouri Valley Conference) (1936–1940)
1936	Washburn	2–6–1	1–4	6th	
1937	Washburn	0–10	0–3	8th	
1938	Washburn	6–3	2–0	NA	
1939	Washburn	6–4	1–3	7th	
1940	Washburn	4–6	0–4	7th	
Washburn Ichabods (Central Intercollegiate Conference) (1941)
1941	Washburn	5–2–2			
Washburn:		23–31–3			
Total:		23–31–3			
