= Aztec Bowl =

Aztec Bowl may refer to:

- Aztec Bowl (game), an annual American college football game in Mexico
- Aztec Bowl (stadium), a former stadium at San Diego State University
