= Glenn D. Vosburg =

American sports coach and college athletics administrator

Biographical details
- Born: December 29, 1883; Fort Atkinson, Wisconsin, U.S.
- Died: July 30, 1964 (aged 80); Fort Atkinson, Wisconsin, U.S.

Coaching career (HC unless noted)

Football
- c. 1920: Great Lakes Navy (assistant)
- 1922: Washburn

Basketball
- 1922–1923: Washburn

Administrative career (AD unless noted)
- 1922: Washburn

Head coaching record
- Overall: 1–7 (football); 7–11 (basketball)

Glenn D. "Mike" Vosburg (December 29, 1883 – July 30, 1964) was an American football and basketball coach and college athletics administrator. He was the 17th head football coach at Washburn University in Topeka, Kansas, serving for one season, in 1922, and compiling a record of 1–7. Football legend Walter Camp stated that the 1922 squad had several good players but produced disappointing results. Vosburg was also the head basketball coach at Washburn in 1922–23, tallying a mark of 7–11. He was also and assistant coach for the Great Lakes Navy Bluejackets football team at Naval Station Great Lakes before coming to Washburn.

Vosburg was born on December 29, 1883, in Fort Atkinson, Wisconsin. He died on July 30, 1964, at Fort Atkinson Memorial Hospital.

== Head coaching record ==
=== Football ===
Year	Team	Overall	Conference	Standing	Bowl/playoffs
Washburn Ichabods (Kansas Collegiate Athletic Conference) (1922)
1922	Washburn	1–7	1–5	14th	
Washburn:		1–7	1–5		
Total:		1–7			
