= 1933 Wichita Shockers football team =

American college football season

1933 Wichita Shockers football

CIC champion
- Conference: Central Intercollegiate Conference
- Record: 8–2 (6–0 CIC)
- Head coach: Al Gebert (4th season)

1933 Central Intercollegiate Conference football standings
	Conf.					Overall
Team	W		L		T	W		L		T
Wichita $	6	–	0	–	0	8	–	2	–	0
Fort Hays State	3	–	1	–	2	6	–	2	–	2
Pittsburg State	2	–	2	–	2	4	–	3	–	2
Washburn	2	–	3	–	1	4	–	6	–	1
Emporia Teachers	2	–	4	–	0	3	–	5	–	1
College of Emporia	1	–	3	–	2	4	–	3	–	2
Southwestern (KS)	1	–	4	–	1	1	–	6	–	2
$ – Conference champion

The 1933 Wichita Shockers football team was an American football team that represented Wichita University (now known as Wichita State University) as a member of the Central Intercollegiate Conference (CIC) during the 1933 college football season. In its fourth season under head coach Al Gebert, the team compiled an 8–2 record.

== Schedule ==
Date	Time	Opponent	Site	Result	Source
September 23		Friends*	Wichita, KS	W 40–6	
September 30		Fort Hays	Wichita, KS	W 13–9	
October 7	8:00 p.m.	at Oklahoma City*	Goldbug Field; Oklahoma City, OK	L 18–26	
October 13		Emporia Teachers	Wichita, KS	W 13–6	
October 21		at College of Emporia	Emporia, KS	W 6–0	
October 27		Pittsburg State	Wichita, KS	W 7–0	
November 4		Saint Louis*	Wichita, KS	L 0–7	
November 11		at Southwestern (KS)	Winfield, KS	W 27–16	
November 18	2:30 p.m.	Haskell*^{†}	Wichita University Field; Wichita, KS	W 28–6	
November 30		Washburn	Wichita, KS	W 19–0	
*Non-conference game; ^{†}Homecoming; All times are in Central time
