= Charles Errickson =

American sports coach

Biographical details
- Born: December 21, 1897; Eureka, Kansas, U.S.
- Died: September 22, 1985 (aged 87); Topeka, Kansas, U.S.

Playing career

Basketball
- c. 1922: Washburn

Coaching career (HC unless noted)

Football
- 1924–1930: Fort Scott
- 1931–1935: Ottawa (KS)
- 1944: Washburn

Basketball
- 1924–1931: Fort Scott
- 1931–1936: Ottawa (KS)
- 1936–1946: Washburn

Administrative career (AD unless noted)
- 1942–1944: Washburn

Head coaching record
- Overall: 19–27–1 (college football); 67–122 (college basketball)

Accomplishments and honors

Championships
- Football; 2 KCAC (1932–1933)

Charles DeLoss "Dee" Errickson (December 21, 1897 – September 22, 1985) was an American college football and college basketball coach and athletics administrator. He served as the head football coach at Ottawa University from 1931 to 1935 and at Washburn University in 1944, compiling a career college football head coaching record of 19–27–1. Errickson was also the head basketball coach at Washburn from 1936 to 1946, tallying a mark of 67–122. In 1941, Errickson was named athletic director at Washburn.

Errickson was born on December 21, 1897, in Eureka, Kansas. He played basketball at Washburn before graduating in 1923. Errickson coached at Fort Scott Community College before moving on to Ottawa. He died in Topeka, Kansas in 1985.

== Head coaching record ==
=== College football ===
Year	Team	Overall	Conference	Standing	Bowl/playoffs
Ottawa Braves (Kansas Collegiate Athletic Conference) (1931–1935)
1931	Ottawa	5–3	2–2	3rd	
1932	Ottawa	7–1	4–0	1st	
1933	Ottawa	5–3	4–0	1st	
1934	Ottawa	1–6–1	1–4	5th	
1935	Ottawa	0–8	0–5	6th	
Ottawa:		18–21–1	11–11		
Washburn Ichabods (Central Intercollegiate Conference) (1944)
1944	Washburn	1–6			
Washburn:		1–6			
Total:		19–27–1			
National championship Conference title Conference division title or championship game berth
