= Bob Raugh =

American football coach

Biographical details
- Born: September 23, 1906; Des Moines, Iowa, U.S.
- Died: December 17, 1983 (aged 77)

Coaching career (HC unless noted)
- 1937–1940: Colby HS (KS)
- 1942–1943: Washburn

Head coaching record
- Overall: 3–10–2 (college)

Robert W. Raugh (September 23, 1906 – December 17, 1983) was an American football coach. He was the 22nd head football coach at Washburn University in Topeka, Kansas serving for two seasons, from 1942 to 1943, compiling a record of 3–10–2. Raugh was an athlete at the University of Nebraska. Before coming to Washburn in 1942, he coached high school athletics in Maxwell, Iowa, Norfolk, Nebraska, and Colby, Kansas.

== Head coaching record ==
=== College ===
Year	Team	Overall	Conference	Standing	Bowl/playoffs
Washburn Ichabods (Central Intercollegiate Conference) (1942–1943)
1942	Washburn	1–6	1–4	5th	
1943	Washburn	2–4–2			
Washburn:		3–10–2			
Total:		3–10–2			
