= Dennis Caryl =

American football coach (born 1942)

Biographical details
- Born: August 31, 1942 (age 84)

Coaching career (HC unless noted)

Football
- 1967–1971: Lenox HS (IA)
- 1974–1976: Northwestern (IA) (OC)
- 1977–1979: Upper Iowa
- 1980: Oklahoma Panhandle State (assistant)
- 1981–1982: Tennessee Tech (assistant)
- 1983: McEachern HS (GA)
- 1984: Lincoln (MO) (assistant)
- 1985–1989: Washburn (DC)
- 1990–1993: Washburn
- 1994: Western New Mexico (DC)
- 1995: Sonoma State (DC)

Girl's/women's basketball
- 1967–1972: Lenox HS (IA)
- 1972–1974: Spencer HS (MO)
- 1980–1981: Oklahoma Panhandle State

Wrestling
- 1974–?: Northwestern (IA)

Track
- 1980–1981: Oklahoma Panhandle State

Head coaching record
- Overall: 16–52 (college football)

Dennis Caryl (born August 31, 1942) is an American former football coach. He served as the head football coach at Upper Iowa University from 1977 to 1979 and Washburn University from 1990 to 1993, compiling a career college football coaching record of 16–52.

After resigning from Washburn eight games into the 1993 season, Caryl was the defensive coordinator at Western New Mexico University in 1994. The following year, he was hired as defensive coordinator at Sonoma State University.

== Head coaching record ==
=== College football ===
Year	Team	Overall	Conference	Standing	Bowl/playoffs
Upper Iowa Peacocks (Iowa Intercollegiate Athletic Conference) (1977–1979)
1977	Upper Iowa	2–7	0–7	8th	
1978	Upper Iowa	4–6	2–5	T–6th	
1979	Upper Iowa	3–7	1–6	8th	
Upper Iowa:		9–20	3–18		
Washburn Ichabods (Mid-America Intercollegiate Athletics Association) (1990–1993)
1990	Washburn	4–6	4–5	T–5th	
1991	Washburn	1–10	1–8	10th	
1992	Washburn	2–8	2–7	8th	
1993	Washburn	0–8 (Note: Caryl resigned after the first eight games of the 1993 season. Andy Williams replaced Tardiff as interim head coach for the final two games of the season. The Ichabods finished 0–10 overall and 0–9 in Central States Intercollegiate Conference play, placing tenth.)	0–7		
Washburn:		7–32			
Total:		16–52			
