= 1977 Iona Gaels football team =

American college football season

1977 Iona Gaels football

Met-7 champion
- Conference: Metropolitan Seven Conference
- Record: 7–0 (5–0 Met-7)
- Head coach: Tony DeMeo (3rd season)
- Offensive scheme: Wishbone
- Captains: Tom McCormick; Bob Tunney; Tom Nolin
- Home stadium: Memorial Field

The 1977 Iona Gaels football team was an American football team that represented Iona University as a member of the Metropolitan Seven Conference (Met-7) during the 1977 National Collegiate Association football season. In their third year under head coach Tony DeMeo, the Gaels compiled a perfect 7–0 record, won the Met-7 championship, and outscored opponents by a total of 210 to 80. The team's captains were Tom McCormick, Bob Tunney, and Tom Nolin. Iowa played home games at Memorial Field in Mount Vernon, New York. The Gaels employed a wishbone offense.

== Schedule ==
Date	Time	Opponent	Site	Result	Attendance	Source
September 17		at Fairfield	Fairfield, CT	W 65–0		
September 30		Pace	Memorial Field; Mount Vernon, NY	W 22–16		
October 8		at St. John's	New York, NY	W 24–14		
October 16		at Marist	Leonidoff Field; Poughkeepsie, NY	W 12–9		
October 21	8:00 p.m.	Brooklyn^{†}	Memorial Field; Mount Vernon, NY	W 15–13		
October 28		Manhattan	Memorial Field; Mount Vernon, NY	W 40–22		
November 4		Fairleigh Dickinson	Memorial Field; Mount Vernon, NY	W 32–6		
^{†}Homecoming; All times are in Eastern time
