= Lew Lane =

American football and basketball coach

Biographical details
- Born: October 17, 1899; St. Marys, Kansas, U.S.
- Died: December 24, 1980 (aged 81); St. Marys, Kansas, U.S.
- Education: Creighton University (1924)

Playing career
- 1924: Kansas City Blues

Coaching career (HC unless noted)

Football
- 1945: Washburn

Basketball
- 1942–1945: Rockhurst
- 1947–1949: Rockhurst

Head coaching record
- Overall: 3–1 (football); 31–67 (basketball)

Lewman Arthur Lane (October 17, 1899 – December 24, 1980) was an American football and basketball coach. He was the 24th head football coach at Washburn University in Topeka, Kansas, serving for one season, in 1945, and compiling a record of 3–1. He had previously coached at Rockhurst University in Kansas City, Missouri before coming to Washburn. He returned there to coach football again in 1947.

Lane was a druggist who managed a family drugstore founded by his father, Daniel J. Lane, in St. Mary's Township, Kansas. He died in 1980.

== Head coaching record ==
=== Football ===
Year	Team	Overall	Conference	Standing	Bowl/playoffs
Washburn Ichabods (Central Intercollegiate Conference) (1945)
1945	Washburn	3–1			
Washburn:		3–1			
Total:		3–1			
