= Bob Chipman (basketball) =

American basketball coach

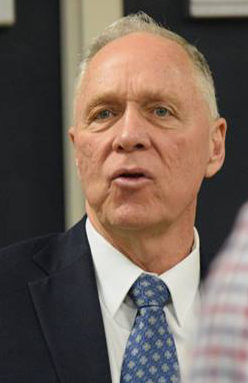
- Chipman during a game in February 2017

Biographical details
- Born: May 18, 1951 (age 75)

Playing career
- 1969–1971: Mott CC
- 1971–1973: Kansas State
- Position: Guard

Coaching career (HC unless noted)
- 1976–1979: Washburn (assistant)
- 1979–2017: Washburn

Head coaching record
- Overall: 808–353 (.696)

Accomplishments and honors

Championships
- NAIA champion (1987); 2 NCAA Division II Regional – Final Four (1994, 2001); 10 MIAA regular season (1992–1995, 1997, 2001, 2003–2005, 2012); 4 MIAA tournament (1992, 1994, 1997, 2001); 2 CSIC regular season (1987, 1988); CSIC tournament (1987)

Awards
- 3× MIAA Coach of the Year (1992, 1993, 2004)

Robert Chipman (born May 18, 1951) is an American retired college basketball coach who coached Washburn University from 1979 to 2017. He is the 24th-winningest coach in college basketball history, with 808 wins.

His 1986–1987 Washburn team won the NAIA national championship, and his 2000–2001 team was the NCAA Division II national runner-up.

His 1992–1993 Washburn team advanced to the Elite 8 of the NCAA Men's Division II Basketball Championship, and his 2000–2001 team advanced to the championship game of the NCAA Men's Division II Basketball Championship.

== Head coaching record ==
Record table
Season	Team	Overall	Conference	Standing	Postseason
Washburn Ichabods (Central States Intercollegiate Conference) (1979–1990)
1979–80	Washburn	20–8	10–4	2nd	
1980–81	Washburn	21–8	9–5	4th	
1981–82	Washburn	22–9	8–6	3rd	NAIA First Round
1982–83	Washburn	18–12	8–6	T–3rd	
1983–84	Washburn	24–9	9–5	T–2nd	
1984–85	Washburn	26–9	10–4	2nd	
1985–86	Washburn	24–9	9–5	4th	
1986–87	Washburn	35–4	13–1	1st	NAIA National Champions
1987–88	Washburn	27–4	14–0	1st	
1988–89	Washburn	24–9	9–5	2nd	NAIA Second Round
1989–90	Washburn	20–12	7–9	3rd	NAIA First Round
Washburn Ichabods (Mid-America Intercollegiate Athletics Association) (1990–2017)
1990–91	Washburn	16–13	9–7	6th	
1991–92	Washburn	27–5	12–4	1st	NCAA Division II Sweet 16
1992–93	Washburn	27–5	13–3	1st	NCAA Division II Elite Eight
1993–94	Washburn	29–4	15–1	1st	NCAA Division II Final Four
1994–95	Washburn	22–8	13–3	T–1st	NCAA Division II First Round
1995–96	Washburn	16–11	9–7	T–3rd	
1996–97	Washburn	24–9	15–3	1st	NCAA Division II Second Round
1997–98	Washburn	19–9	11–5	4th	
1998–99	Washburn	20–10	11–5	4th	
1999–00	Washburn	23–7	14–4	2nd	NCAA Division II Second Round
2000–01	Washburn	29–5	15–3	1st	NCAA Division II Runner-up
2001–02	Washburn	20–8	12–6	T–3rd	
2002–03	Washburn	26–6	15–3	1st	NCAA Division II Second Round
2003–04	Washburn	27–5	15–3	1st	NCAA Division II Second Round
2004–05	Washburn	24–8	14–4	T–1st	NCAA Division II First Round
2005–06	Washburn	10–16	4–12	9th	
2006–07	Washburn	8–19	4–14	10th	
2007–08	Washburn	18–11	9–9	T–6th	
2008–09	Washburn	16–13	11–9	6th	
2009–10	Washburn	16–14	8–12	8th	
2010–11	Washburn	18–10	15–7	3rd	NCAA Division II First Round
2011–12	Washburn	25–8	15–5	T–1st	NCAA Division II Second Round
2012–13	Washburn	19–8	12–6	3rd	
2013–14	Washburn	17–10	10–9	T–6th	
2014–15	Washburn	16–16	10–9	8th	
2015–16	Washburn	15–13	11–11	T–5th	
2016–17	Washburn	20–10	11–8	T–4th	
Washburn:		808–353 (.696)	411–222 (.649)		
Total:		808–353 (.696)			

== See also ==
- List of college men's basketball coaches with 600 wins
