= George Gardner (coach) =

American football and basketball coach (1898–1974)

Biographical details
- Born: September 28, 1898; Greene County, Iowa, U.S.
- Died: January 1974 (aged 75); Arkansas City, Kansas, U.S.

Playing career

Basketball
- 1919–1922: Southwestern (KS)

Coaching career (HC unless noted)

Football
- 1925–1929: McPherson

Basketball
- 1930–1933: Washburn
- 1937–1939: Southwestern (KS)

Head coaching record
- Overall: 10–25–4 (football); 60–36 (basketball)

George D. Gardner (September 28, 1898 – January, 1974) was an American football and basketball coach. He was the head football coach at McPherson College in McPherson, Kansas, serving for five seasons, from 1925 until 1929, and compiling a record of 10–25–4.

In 1937, Gardner was named basketball coach at Southwestern College in Winfield, Kansas. At the time he had been working as an insurance agent at Arkansas City, Kansas, where he continued to work when not on coaching duty.

== Head coaching record ==
=== Football ===
Year	Team	Overall	Conference	Standing	Bowl/playoffs
McPherson Bulldogs (Kansas Collegiate Athletic Conference) (1925–1929)
1925	McPherson	1–4–2	0–4–2	T–14th	
1926	McPherson	3–4–1	2–4	11th	
1927	McPherson	1–7	1–6	T–13th	
1928	McPherson	1–6–1	1–5–1	8th	
1929	McPherson	4–4	2–3	4th	
McPherson:		10–25–4	6–22–3		
Total:		10–25–4			
