= Robert Stewart (American football coach) =

American football coach

Coaching career (HC unless noted)
- 1909–1910: Washburn

Administrative career (AD unless noted)
- 1909–1910: Washburn

Head coaching record
- Overall: 8–8

Robert Stewart was an American college football coach. He served as the 11th head football coach for Washburn University in Topeka, Kansas and he held that position for two seasons, from 1909 until 1910. His record at Washburn was 8–8. Stewart also served as the athletic director at Washburn for one year.

== Head coaching record ==
Year	Team	Overall	Conference	Standing	Bowl/playoffs
Washburn Ichabods (Kansas Collegiate Athletic Conference) (1909–1910)
1909	Washburn	4–4			
1910	Washburn	4–4			
Washburn:		8–8			
Total:		8–8			
