= Glenn Jagodzinske =

American football player and sports coach (born 1947)

Biographical details
- Born: April 5, 1947 (age 79)

Playing career

Football
- 1965–1968: Westmar

Coaching career (HC unless noted)

Football
- 1969–1970: Hubbard HS (IA)
- 1971–1974: Sheldon HS (IA)
- 1975–1977: Huron
- 1975–1977: Huron
- 1978–1980: Westmar
- 1981–1982: Washburn

Track
- 1969–1971: Hubbard HS (IA)

Head coaching record
- Overall: 36–41–1 (college football)

Glenn Jagodzinske (born April 5, 1947) is an American former football and track and field coach. He served as the head football coach at Huron College—later known as Huron University—in Huron, South Dakota from 1975 to 1977, Westmar University in Le Mars, Iowa from 1978 to 1980, and Washburn University in Topeka, Kansas, from 1981 to 1982, and compiling college football coaching record of 36–41–1.

Jagodzinske lettered for four years on the football team at Westmar College—later known as Westmar University—in Le Mars, Iowa before graduating in 1969. He began his coaching career as football and track mentor at Hubbard High School in Hubbard, Iowa. Jagodzinske moved to Sheldon High School in Sheldon, Iowa, where he served as head football coach.

== Head coaching record ==
=== College football ===
Year	Team	Overall	Conference	Standing	Bowl/playoffs
Huron Tribe (South Dakota Intercollegiate Conference) (1975–1977)
1975	Huron	3–6	3–2	3rd	
1976	Huron	4–5–1	1–3–1	5th	
1977	Huron	3–6	2–3	4th	
Huron:		10–17–1	6–8–1		
Westmar Eagles (Tri-State Conference) (1978–1980)
1978	Westmar	8–2	2–1	2nd	
1979	Westmar	7–3	2–1	2nd	
1980	Westmar	7–3	1–1	2nd	
Westmar:		22–8	5–3		
Washburn Ichabods (Central States Intercollegiate Conference) (1981–1982)
1981	Washburn	3–7	3–4	T–4th	
1982	Washburn	1–9	1–6	T–6th	
Washburn:		4–16	4–10		
Total:		36–41–1			
