= Gary Hampton =

American football player and coach

Garland A. Hampton III
Biographical details
- Born: February 20, 1948
- Died: February 14, 1993 (aged 44); Fayetteville, Arkansas, U.S.

Playing career

Football
- 1966–1969: Kansas Wesleyan
- Position: Linebacker

Coaching career (HC unless noted)

Football
- ?: Kiowa HS (KS)
- ?: West Elk HS (KS)
- ?–1978: Idaho State (assistant)
- 1979–1980: Washburn

Head coaching record
- Overall: 6–14 (college football)

Gary Hampton was an American former football coach. He was the 33rd head football coach at Washburn University in Topeka, Kansas serving for two seasons, from 1979 to 1980, and compiling a record of 6–14. Hampton played college football at as a linebacker at Kansas Wesleyan University. Before being hired at Washburn, he was an assistant football and head golf coach at Idaho State University.

== Head coaching record ==
=== College football ===
Year	Team	Overall	Conference	Standing	Bowl/playoffs
Washburn Ichabods (Central States Intercollegiate Conference) (1979–1980)
1979	Washburn	4–6	2–5	T–7th	
1980	Washburn	2–8	1–6	T–7th	
Washburn:		6–14	3–11		
Total:		6–14			
