= Bob Noblitt =

American football and wrestling coach (born 1942)

Biographical details
- Born: August 29, 1942
- Died: March 20, 2025 (aged 82)

Playing career

Football
- 1964–1965: Washburn
- Position: Guard

Coaching career (HC unless noted)

Football
- 1966: Southern Illinois (GA)
- 1967–1968: Yankton (assistant)
- 1969–1970: Washburn (assistant)
- 1971–1973: Washburn
- 1974–1983: Texas–Arlington (assistant)
- 1984–1999: Air Force (assistant)

Wrestling
- 1967–1969: Yankton

Head coaching record
- Overall: 12–17–1 (football)

Bob Noblitt (born 1942) is an American former football and wrestling coach. He was the 31st head football coach at Washburn University in Topeka, Kansas serving for three seasons, from 1971 to 1973, and compiling a record of 12–17–1. Noblitt came to Washburn as an assistant in 1969 after having worked as an assistant football coach and head wrestling coach at Yankton College in Yankton, South Dakota.

== Head coaching record ==
=== Football ===
Year	Team	Overall	Conference	Standing	Bowl/playoffs
Washburn Ichabods (Rocky Mountain Athletic Conference) (1971)
1971	Washburn	5–5	NA	NA (Plains)	
Washburn Ichabods (Great Plains Athletic Conference) (1972–1973)
1972	Washburn	4–6	1–5	T–6th	
1973	Washburn	3–6–1	2–3	T–3rd	
Washburn:		12–17–1	3–8		
Total:		12–17–1			
