= Roy Wynne =

American football and basketball coach

Biographical details
- Born: March 23, 1894; Kansas, U.S.
- Died: September 22, 1977 (aged 83); Clay County, Kansas, U.S.
- Education: Ottawa University

Coaching career (HC unless noted)

Football
- 1925–1926: Chadron Normal
- 1927–1928: Washburn

Basketball
- 1925–1927: Chadron Normal
- 1927–1930: Washburn

Head coaching record
- Overall: 18–18 (football); 45–38 (basketball)

Accomplishments and honors

Championships
- Football; 2 NCAC (1925–1926)

Roy W. Wynne (March 23, 1894 – September 22, 1977) was an American football and basketball coach. He served as the head football coach at Chadron State College from 1925 to 1926 and Washburn University from 1927 to 1928, compiling a career college football coaching record of 18–18. Wynne was also the head basketball coach at Chadron State from 1925 to 1927 and at Washburn from 1927 to 1930, tallying a career college basketball coaching record of 45–38.

== Coaching career ==
Wynne the 19th head football coach at Washburn University in Topeka, Kansas, a position he held for two seasons, from 1927 until 1928, compiling a record of 3–14.

== Head coaching record ==
=== Football ===
Year	Team	Overall	Conference	Standing	Bowl/playoffs
Chadron Normal Eagles (Nebraska College Athletic Conference) (1925–1926)
1925	Chadron Normal	9–0	6–0	1st	
1926	Chadron Normal	6–4	6–0	1st	
Chadron Normal:		15–4	12–0		
Washburn Ichabods (Kansas Collegiate Athletic Conference) (1927)
1927	Washburn	1–7	1–6	T–13th	
Washburn Ichabods (Central Intercollegiate Conference) (1928)
1928	Washburn	2–7	1–5	6th	
Washburn:		3–14	2–11		
Total:		17–33–6			
National championship Conference title Conference division title or championship game berth
