= 1949 Pittsburg State Gorillas football team =

American college football season

1949 Pittsburg State Gorillas football

CIC co-champion
- Conference: Central Intercollegiate Conference
- Record: 8–2–1 (5–1 CIC)
- Head coach: Carnie Smith (1st season)
- Captains: Jim Gumfory; Art Parkhurst
- Home stadium: Brandenburg Stadium

1949 Central Intercollegiate Conference football standings
	Conf.					Overall
Team	W		L		T	W		L		T
Washburn +	5	–	1	–	0	7	–	2	–	0
Pittsburg State +	5	–	1	–	0	8	–	2	–	1
Emporia State	4	–	2	–	0	6	–	4	–	0
Fort Hays State	4	–	2	–	0	5	–	4	–	0
St. Benedict's	2	–	4	–	0	4	–	5	–	0
Southwestern (KS)	1	–	5	–	0	2	–	7	–	0
Rockhurst	0	–	6	–	0	1	–	9	–	0
+ – Conference co-champions

The 1949 Pittsburg State Gorillas football team represented Kansas State Teachers College of Pittsburg—now known as Pittsburg State University—as a member of the Central Intercollegiate Conference (CIC) during the 1949 college football season. Led by first-year head coach Carnie Smith, the Gorillas compiled an overall record of 8–2–1 with a mark of 5–1 in conference play, sharing the CIC title with Washburn.

== Schedule ==
Date	Time	Opponent	Site	Result	Attendance	Source
September 16	8:00 p.m.	Missouri Mines*	Pittsburg, KS	W 27–7		
September 24		at River Falls State*	River Falls, WI	W 34–0		
October 1		Southwest Missouri State*	Pittsburg, KS	W 27–14	5,000	
October 8	8:00 p.m.	Fort Hays State	Pittsburg, KS	W 26–7		
October 15		at Washburn	Topeka, KS	L 19–27		
October 21		at Southwestern (KS)	Winfield, KS	W 21–12		
October 29		St. Benedict's^{†}	Pittsburg, KS	W 41–7	8,000	
November 5		at Emporia State	Emporia, KS	W 27–7		
November 11	8:45 p.m.	at Evansville*	Bosse Field; Evansville, IN	L 7–38	5,400	
November 18		Arkansas Tech*	Pittsburg, KS	T 20–20		
November 24		Rockhurst	Pittsburg, KS	W 46–6		
*Non-conference game; ^{†}Homecoming; All times are in Central time
