= Andy Williams (American football) =

American football coach

Playing career
- 1982–1985: Missouri Western
- Position: Quarterback

Coaching career (HC unless noted)
- 1986: Missouri Western (GA)
- 1987–1988: Utah State (GA/DB/ST)
- 1989: Phoenix (DC)
- 1990–1993: Washburn (assistant)
- 1993: Washburn (interim HC)
- 1994–?: Washburn (DC)

Head coaching record
- Overall: 0–2

Andy Williams is an American football coach. He was the interim head football coach at the Washburn University in Topeka, Kansas for two games during the 1993 season, compiling a record of 0–2.

== Head coaching record ==
Year	Team	Overall	Conference	Standing	Bowl/playoffs
Washburn Ichabods (Mid-America Intercollegiate Athletics Association) (1993)
1993	Washburn	0–2 (Note: Dennis Caryl coach the first eight games of the 1993 season before resigning. Williams replaced him as interim head coach for the final two games of the season. The Ichabods finished 0–10 overall and 0–9 in Central States Intercollegiate Conference play.)	0–2	10th	
Washburn:		0–2			
Total:		0–2			
