= Ed Linta =

American football player and coach (born 1932)

Biographical details
- Born: 1932 (age 93–94)

Playing career
- 1952–1954: Kansas State
- Position: End

Coaching career (HC unless noted)
- 1959–1961: Arizona (assistant)
- 1962: Wyoming (DB)
- 1963: Eastern Arizona
- 1964: Washburn (assistant)
- 1965–1966: Washburn

Head coaching record
- Overall: 4–13–1 (college)

Edward Linta (born 1932) is an American former football coach. He was the 28th head football coach at Washburn University in Topeka, Kansas, serving for two seasons, from 1965 to 1966, and compiling a record of 4–13–1. Linta played college football as an end at Kansas State University from 1952 to 1954. before coming to Washburn as an assistant in 1964, he was the head football coach at Eastern Arizona Junior College—now known as Eastern Arizona College—in 1963 and was an assistant football coach at the University of Arizona from 1959 to 1961 and the University of Wyoming in 1962.

== Head coaching record ==
=== College ===
Year	Team	Overall	Conference	Standing	Bowl/playoffs
Washburn Ichabods (Central Intercollegiate Conference) (1965–1966)
1965	Washburn	2–6–1	1–3	4th	
1966	Washburn	2–7	1–3	4th	
Washburn:		4–13–1	2–6		
Total:		4–13–1			
