= H. Ward Page =

American football coach (1876–1949)

Biographical details
- Born: January 31, 1876; Edgerton, Wisconsin, U.S.
- Died: September 1, 1949 (aged 73); Ottawa, Kansas, U.S.

Coaching career (HC unless noted)
- 1902: Washburn

Head coaching record
- Overall: 3–4

Herbert Ward Page (January 31, 1876 – September 1, 1949) was an American football coach. He was the seventh head football coach at Washburn University in Topeka, Kansas, serving for one season, in 1902, and compiling a record of 3–4. Page died on September 1, 1949, at his home in Ottawa, Kansas. He had practiced law in the Topeka area for around 50 years.

== Head coaching record ==
Year	Team	Overall	Conference	Standing	Bowl/playoffs
Washburn Ichabods (Independent) (1902)
1902	Washburn	3–4			
Washburn:		3–4			
Total:		3–4			
