= Glen Gray (American football) =

American athlete and coach (1888–1921)

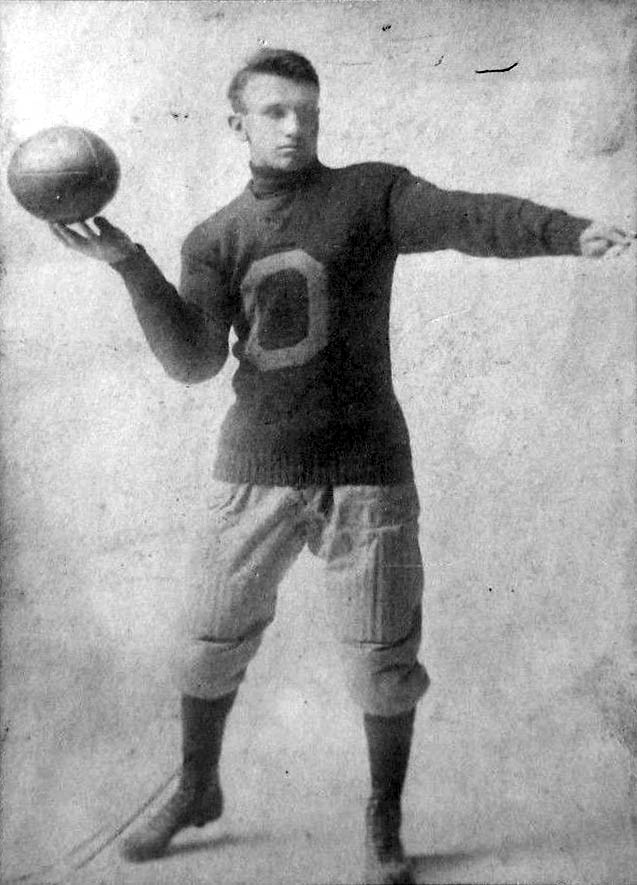
- Gray during the 1907 season at Oberlin

Biographical details
- Born: December 27, 1888; Charlotteville, Ontario, Canada
- Died: June 7, 1921 (aged 32); Duchesne, Utah, U.S.

Playing career

Football
- 1907–1909: Oberlin

Basketball
- 1907–1910: Oberlin
- Position: Halfback (football)

Coaching career (HC unless noted)

Football
- 1910: Oberlin (assistant)
- 1911–1912: Oberlin
- 1913–1915: Washburn

Basketball
- 1910–1911: Oberlin
- 1912–1913: Oberlin

Administrative career (AD unless noted)
- 1913–1916: Washburn

Head coaching record
- Overall: 23–13–4 (football); 17–7 (basketball)

Accomplishments and honors

Championships
- Football; 1 OAC (1911); 1 KCAC (1914)

Glen Carlton Gray (December 27, 1888 – June 7, 1921) was an American college football and college basketball player and coach. He served as the Head football coach at Oberlin College from 1911 to 1912 and at Washburn College—now known as Washburn University—from 1913 to 1915, compiling a career college football head coaching record of 23–13–4. Gray was also the head basketball coach at Oberlin in 1910–11 and 1912–13, tallying a mark of 17–7.

Gray was born in Charlotteville, Ontario, Canada, and attended North Tonawanda High School in North Tonawanda, New York, from which he graduated in 1906. He was a quarterback and placekicker on the football team coached Ben Hinkey. "Glen Gray as I remember him was not the agile, hip-swiveling runner many people might imagine," Hinkey recalled. "He had, I believe, a wonderful change of pace and an ability to stop short when travelling at top speed, and then sidestepping a tackler quickly. He was an awfully hard man to tackle, because his speed and stopping ability were so hard to judge."

Gray attended Oberlin, where played football as a halfback, and was a member of the basketball and baseball teams. He also starred on the track team as a long jumper before graduating in 1911. He was inducted in the Oberlin College Sports Hall of Fame in 1986.

Gray was the head football coach at Oberlin 1911 and 1912, lead his teams to a record of 13–2–1 in two seasons. He was the 13th head football coach at Washburn, serving for three seasons, from 1913 to 1915, and compiling a record of 11–10–3. Gray resigned from his post at Washburn in 1916.

After leaving coaching, Gray worked in banking as well as film, newspaper, and oil businesses. He was accidentally shot to death on June 7, 1921, in Duchesne, Utah, when he was mistaken for a bear during an assessment work party. His demise was described in 1947 by The News of the Towandas: "Clad in a brown khaki shirt and trousers, Glen had gone into the brush to inspect one of his outlying oil lands. An itinerant hunter who was stalking games in the nearby desert country mistook Gray's moving shape for game and shot him. The great Glen Gray fell dead."

== Head coaching record ==
=== Football ===
Year	Team	Overall	Conference	Standing	Bowl/playoffs
Oberlin Yeomen (Ohio Athletic Conference) (1911–1912)
1911	Oberlin	6–1–1	4–0–1	1st	
1912	Oberlin	7–1	5–1	2nd	
Oberlin:		13–2–1	9–1–1		
Washburn Ichabods (Kansas Collegiate Athletic Conference) (1913–1915)
1913	Washburn	3–3–2	2–0–2	3rd	
1914	Washburn	5–3		1st	
1915	Washburn	2–5–1	1–2–1	T–10th	
Washburn:		10–11–3			
Total:		23–13–4			
National championship Conference title Conference division title or championship game berth
