= George Tardiff =

American football player and coach (1936–2012)

Biographical details
- Born: October 2, 1936; Jersey City, New Jersey, U.S.
- Died: September 21, 2012 (aged 75); Brick, New Jersey, U.S.

Playing career
- 1955–1959: St. Benedict's

Coaching career (HC unless noted)
- c. 1960: Lincoln HS (NJ) (assistant)
- 1967–1970: St. Mary of the Plains (assistant)
- 1971: Red Bank Regional HS (NJ) (assistant)
- 1972: Lakewood HS (NJ) (assistant)
- 1973: Freehold HS (NJ)
- 1974–1976: Benedictine (KS)
- 1977–1982: East Brunswick HS (NJ)
- 1983–1984: Washburn
- 1986–1987: Marlboro HS (NJ)
- 1988: Lakewood HS (NJ)
- 1990–1996: Raritan HS (NJ)

Head coaching record
- Overall: 22–23 (college)
- Bowls: 1–1

Accomplishments and honors

Championships
- 1 CSIC (1983)

George F. Tardiff (October 2, 1936 – September 21, 2012) was an American football coach at the collegiate and high school level. He served as the head football coach at Benedictine College in Atchison, Kansas from 1974 to 1976 and Washburn University in Topeka, Kansas from 1983 to 1984, compiling a career college football coaching record of 22–23.

Born in Jersey City, Tardiff played prep football at Lincoln High School before attending St. Benedict's College (now Benedictine College) in Atchison, Kansas.

== Coaching career ==
=== Benedictine ===
Tardiff was the head football coach for Benedictine College for three seasons, from 1974 to 1976. His coaching record at Benedictine was 15–15.

=== Washburn ===
Tardiff was the 35th head football coach at Washburn University in Topeka, Kansas, serving for two seasons, from 1983 to 1984. His coaching record at Washburn was 8–7.

== Death ==
A resident of Brick Township, New Jersey, Tardiff died at Ocean Medical Center after a short illness in 2012.

== Head coaching record ==
=== College ===
Year	Team	Overall	Conference	Standing	Bowl/playoffs
Benedictine Ravens (NAIA Division II independent) (1974–1976)
1974	Benedictine	2–7			
1975	Benedictine	5–5			
1976	Benedictine	7–4			W Boot Hill
Benedictine:		14–16			
Washburn Ichabods (Central States Intercollegiate Conference) (1983–1984)
1983	Washburn	8–2	6–1	1st	
1984	Washburn	0–5 (Note: Tardiff resigned after the first five games of the 1984 season. Larry Elliott replaced Tardiff as head coach and led Washburn to a record of 2–3 over the final five games of the season. The Ichabods finished 2–8 overall and 2–5 in Central States Intercollegiate Conference play, tying for sixth place.)	0–2		
Washburn:		8–7	6–3		
Total:		22–23			
National championship Conference title Conference division title or championship game berth
