= Lawrence Banks =

American football player and coach (1880–1935)

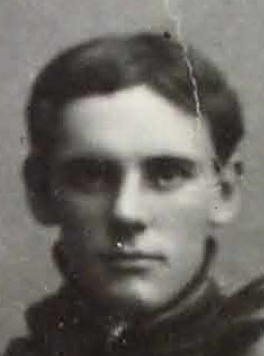
- Banks on the 1899 Washburn football team photo

Biographical details
- Born: August 1, 1880; Topeka, Kansas, U.S.
- Died: September 29, 1935 (aged 55); St. Louis, Missouri, U.S.

Playing career
- 1899: Washburn
- Position: Guard

Coaching career (HC unless noted)
- 1901: Washburn

Head coaching record
- Overall: 3–2–3

Lawrence B. Banks (August 1, 1880 – September 29, 1935) was an American football player and coach. He was the sixth head football coach for Washburn University in Topeka, Kansas, serving for one season, in 1901, and compiling a record of 3–2–3. The son of Alexander and Jennie Banks, Banks attended Washburn as a preparatory student from 1898 to 1900. He died in 1935 of a cerebral hemorrhage.

== Head coaching record ==
Year	Team	Overall	Conference	Standing	Bowl/playoffs
Washburn Ichabods (Independent) (1901)
1901	Washburn	3–2–3			
Washburn:		3–2–3			
Total:		3–2–3			
