= William Melford =

American football player and coach (1876–1962)

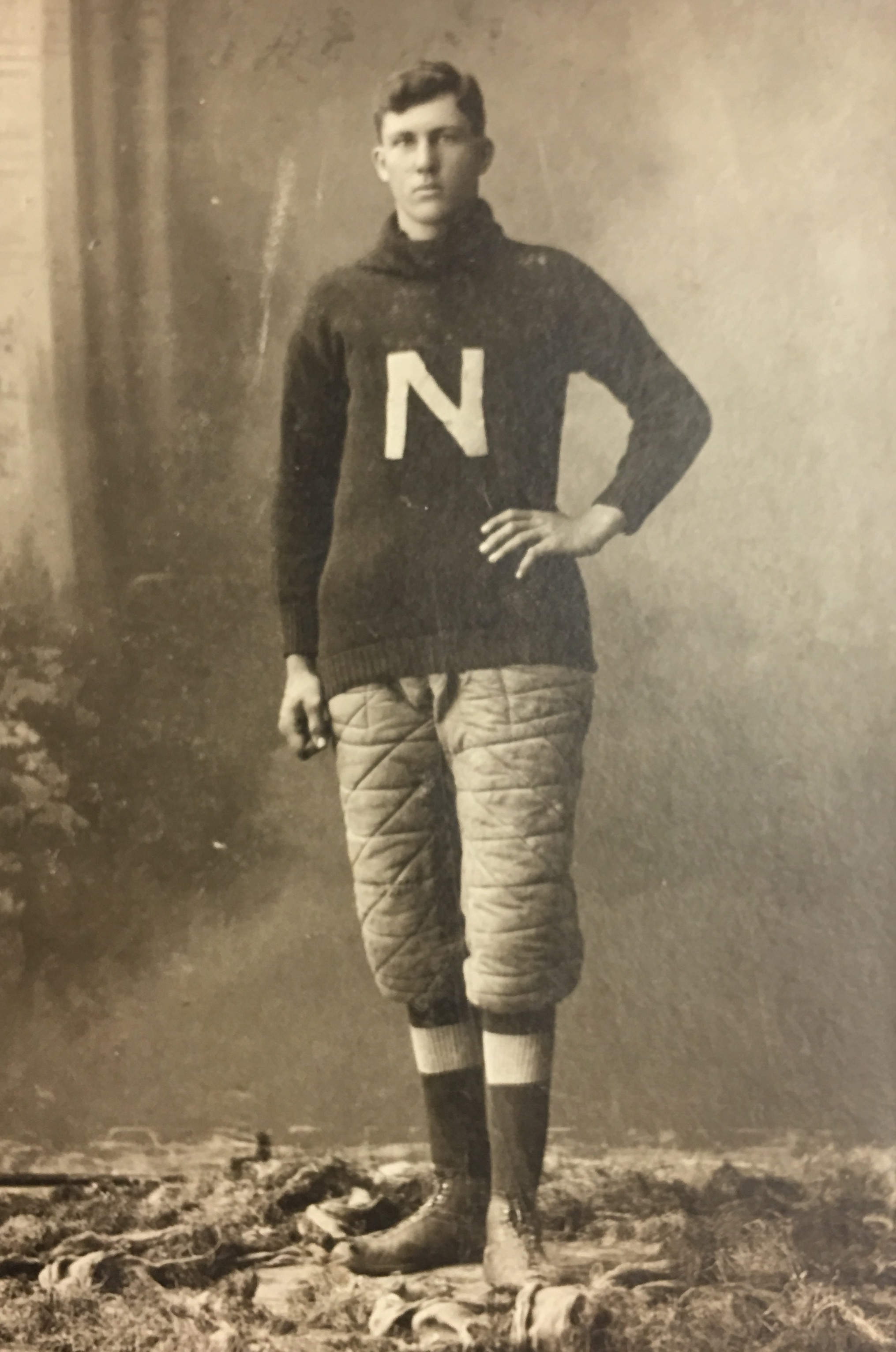
- Melford in 1898 at Nebraska

Biographical details
- Born: March 28, 1876; Pennsylvania, U.S.
- Died: January 12, 1962 (aged 85); Los Angeles, California, U.S.

Playing career
- 1896–1898: Nebraska
- Position: Center

Coaching career (HC unless noted)
- 1899: Washburn

Head coaching record
- Overall: 2–5–2

William Carl Melford (March 28, 1876 – January 12, 1962) was an American college football player and coach. He was the fourth head football coach at Washburn College—now known as Washburn University—in Topeka, Kansas, serving for one season, in 1899, and compiling a record of 2–5–2.

== Head coaching record ==
Year	Team	Overall	Conference	Standing	Bowl/playoffs
Washburn Ichabods (Independent) (1899)
1899	Washburn	2–5–2			
Washburn:		2–5–2			
Total:		2–5–2			
