= Dwight Ream =

American sports coach and college athletics administrator

Biographical details
- Born: March 23, 1892; Topeka, Kansas, U.S.
- Died: November 20, 1954 (aged 62); Topeka, Kansas, U.S.

Coaching career (HC unless noted)

Football
- 1920–1921: Washburn

Basketball
- 1921–1922: Washburn

Administrative career (AD unless noted)
- 1921–1922: Washburn

Head coaching record
- Overall: 7–7–4 (football); 8–9 (basketball)

Accomplishments and honors

Championships
- Football; 1 KCAC (1920)

Dwight Thoburn Ream (March 23, 1892 – November 20, 1954) was an American football and basketball coach and college athletics administrator. He was the 16th head football coach at Washburn University in Topeka, Kansas, serving for two seasons, from 1920 to 1921, and compiling a record of 8–7–4. In the 1920 game against Kansas Normal under coach Homer Woodson Hargiss, Kansas Normal fullback Jack Reeves sustained a neck injury that resulted in his death. Ream was also the head basketball coach at Washburn in 1921–22, tallying a mark of 8–9.

Ream died after a long illness (heart ailment) in 1954.

== Head coaching record ==
=== Football ===
Year	Team	Overall	Conference	Standing	Bowl/playoffs
Washburn Ichabods (Kansas Collegiate Athletic Conference) (1920–1921)
1920	Washburn	4–2–3	4–0–2	T–1st	
1921	Washburn	3–5–1	3–3–1	T–8th	
Washburn:		7–7–4	7–3–2		
Total:		7–7–4			
National championship Conference title Conference division title or championship game berth
