= Garfield Weede =

American sports coach and athletic director (1880–1971)

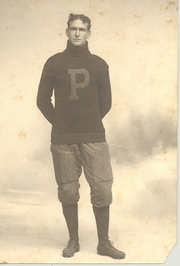
- Weede, suited up for football at Penn

Biographical details
- Born: November 26, 1880; Burlington, Iowa, U.S.
- Died: November 21, 1971 (aged 90); Wichita, Kansas, U.S.

Playing career

Football
- 1898–1900: Cooper
- 1901–1905: Penn
- Positions: Quarterback, end, placekicker

Coaching career (HC unless noted)

Football
- 1906–1908: Washburn
- 1910–1918: Cooper
- 1919–1928: Pittsburg State

Basketball
- 1919–1922: Pittsburg State

Administrative career (AD unless noted)
- 1905–1909: Washburn
- 1919–1951: Pittsburg State

Head coaching record
- Overall: 90–69–15 (football); 30–32

Accomplishments and honors

Championships
- 3 KCAC (1907, 1919, 1924)

Awards
- Second-team All-American (1904); Kansas Sports Hall of Fame; NAIA Track and Field Hall of Fame

Garfield Wilson Weede (November 26, 1880 – November 21, 1971) was an American football, basketball, and track and field coach and athletic director. He was one of the first college coaches to "break the color line" and allow racial integration among his players.

== Playing career ==
Weede played football at Cooper Memorial College—now known as Sterling College—as a quarterback from 1898 to 1900. He then played at the University of Pennsylvania as an end and placekicker. He was severely injured in a game in October 1905. Under head coach Carl S. Williams, the 1904 Penn Quakers football team was undefeated with a record of 12–0, and has since retroactively been declared a national champion for that year.

== Coaching career ==
=== Washburn ===
Weede was the tenth head football coach for Washburn University in Topeka, Kansas, as well as the athletic director. He held the position for three seasons, from 1906 until 1908, and followed John H. Outland. Weede's coaching record at Washburn was 20–6–4. Football legend Walter Camp called him a "familiar winner" in one of his reviews of the program and his 1907 team finished the season undefeated and untied with victories of Kansas State, Kansas, and Oklahoma.

=== Cooper ===
Weede next became the head football coach at Cooper Memorial College—now known as Sterling College—in Sterling, Kansas. He held that position for nine seasons, from 1910 until 1918. His coaching record at Cooper was 24–30–4. Weede is a member of the Sterling College Athletic Hall of Fame.

=== Pittsburg State ===
In 1919, Weede was hired as coach of all sports and athletic director at Pittsburg Manual Training Normal in Pittsburg, Kansas. He coached the football team to a 46–33–7 record from 1919 to 1928 including the school's first undefeated team in 1924. That year, his team was declared Kansas Collegiate Athletic Conference champions.

Weede ended his football coaching career on a downturn, losing every game of his final season of 1928. His squad only scored in two of seven games and allowed a total of 113 points.

== Legacy ==
Weede was inducted in the Kansas Sports Hall of Fame in 1961. Although he spent most of his time and efforts in college athletics, he also was a dentist, having earned a Doctor of Dental Surgery degree from the University of Pennsylvania in 1906.

== Head coaching record ==
=== Football ===
Year	Team	Overall	Conference	Standing	Bowl/playoffs
Washburn Ichabods (Kansas Collegiate Athletic Conference) (1906–1908)
1906	Washburn	8–1–3			
1907	Washburn	8–0		1st	
1908	Washburn	4–5–1			
Washburn:		20–6–4			
Cooper Barrelmakers (Kansas Collegiate Athletic Conference) (1910–1918)
1910	Cooper	0–3–1			
1911	Cooper	0–4			
1912	Cooper	2–4			
1913	Cooper	3–3			
1914	Cooper	4–4			
1915	Cooper	7–1–1	6–1–1	3rd	
1916	Cooper	6–3	6–3	T–6th	
1917	Cooper	2–5–1	2–5–1	T–11th	
1918	Cooper	0–3–1			
Cooper:		24–30–4			
Pittsburg State Gorillas (Kansas Collegiate Athletic Conference) (1919–1927)
1919	Pittsburg State	7–2–1	5–0–1	T–1st	
1920	Pittsburg State	5–4–1	3–3	8th	
1921	Pittsburg State	7–2–1	5–1–1	3rd	
1922	Pittsburg State	4–5	3–4	10th	
1923	Pittsburg State	3–3–2	2–2–2	T–8th	
1924	Pittsburg State	7–0–1	5–0–1	1st	
1925	Pittsburg State	5–2–1	5–2	4th	
1926	Pittsburg State	2–6	2–5	T–12th	
1927	Pittsburg State	6–2	5–2	T–5th	
Pittsburg State Gorillas (Central Intercollegiate Conference) (1928)
1928	Pittsburg State	0–7	0–6	7th	
Pittsburg State:		46–33–7	35–25–5		
Total:		90–69–15			
