= Tony DeMeo =

American football player and coach (born 1948)

Biographical details
- Born: July 5, 1948 (age 78); Pelham, New York, U.S.

Playing career
- 1967–1970: Iona
- Positions: Tailback, defensive back

Coaching career (HC unless noted)
- 1973–1974: Pace (assistant)
- 1975–1978: Iona
- 1979–1980: Penn (backfield)
- 1981–1987: Mercyhurst
- 1988: Temple (OC/QB)
- 1989: Delaware (assistant)
- 1990: James Madison (OC)
- 1991: UMass (assistant)
- 1992–1993: Murray State (OC)
- 1994–2001: Washburn
- 2002–2004: Richmond (OC)
- 2005–2010: Charleston (WV)

Head coaching record
- Overall: 137–108–4

Accomplishments and honors

Awards
- 2× Metropolitan Conference COY (1976–1977); Eastern Intercollegiate Athletic Association COY (1985); MIAA Coach of the Year (1999); D2football.com WVIAC Football Coach of the Year (2005); Iona College Hall of Fame (1997); Mercyhurst Hall of Fame (2017); University of Charleston Hall of Fame (2024)

Tony DeMeo (born July 5, 1948) is an American former college football coach. He served as the head football coach at Iona College in New Rochelle, New York from 1975 to 1978, Mercyhurst College—now known as Mercyhurst University—in Erie, Pennsylvania from 1981 to 1987, Washburn University in Topeka, Kansas from 1994 to 2001, and the University of Charleston in Charleston, West Virginia from 2005 to 2010.

DeMeo also worked as the offensive coordinator at Temple University (1988), James Madison University (1990), Murray State University (1992), and the University of Richmond (2002–2004). He was an assistant football coach at Pace University (1973–1974), the University of Pennsylvania (1979–1980), the University of Delaware (1989) and the University of Massachusetts Amherst (1991).

== Coaching career ==
DeMeo began his head coaching career at his alma mater, Iona College. He compiled a 22–10–2 record at Iona and was twice named Metropolitan area coach of the year (1976 and 1977). DeMeo was inducted into the Iona College Hall of Fame in 1997 for his affiliation with two undefeated teams: first as a player in 1967 and then as the head coach in 1977.

DeMeo moved to the University of Pennsylvania in 1979 to serve as backfield coach for the Penn Quakers football team on the staff of head coach Harry Gamble.

In March 1981, DeMeo was hired as the first head coach for the new football team at Mercyhurst College—now known as Mercyhurst University. In seven seasons at Mercyhurst, he led the Lakers to a record of 41–21–2. DeMeo was named Eastern Intercollegiate Athletic Association Coach of the Year in 1985. He was inducted into the Mercyhurst University Hall of Fame in 2017.

DeMeo was the 39th head football coach at Washburn University in Topeka, Kansas, serving for eight seasons, from 1994 to 2001, and compiling a record of 31–54. His 31 wins are third-most among head coaches in Washburn's history, behind Ernest Bearg and Craig Schurig. After leading Washburn to a 6–5 record in 1999, the program's first winning season in over 10 years, and DeMeo was named Mid-America Intercollegiate Athletics Association (MIAA) Coach of the Year.

DeMeo coached at the University of Charleston in West Virginia from 2005 to 2010. His Golden Eagles finished the 2007 season with an 8–3 record and ranked ninth in the Northeast Region of Division II. Charleston tied for second place in the West Virginia Intercollegiate Athletic Conference (WVIAC).

== Head coaching record ==
Year	Team	Overall	Conference	Standing	Bowl/playoffs
Iona Gaels (Metropolitan Seven Conference—non-NCAA) (1975–1977)
1975	Iona	5–4–1			
1976	Iona	5–2–1			
1977	Iona	7–0			
Iona Gaels (Metropolitan Intercollegiate Conference) (1978)
1978	Iona	5–4	2–2	T–3rd	
Iona:		22–10–2			
Mercyhurst Lakers (NCAA Division III independent) (1981–1987)
1981	Mercyhurst	4–2–1			
1982	Mercyhurst	4–5			
1983	Mercyhurst	5–3–1			
1984	Mercyhurst	8–1			
1985	Mercyhurst	8–2			
1986	Mercyhurst	6–4			
1987	Mercyhurst	6–4			
Mercyhurst:		41–21–2			
Washburn Ichabods (Mid-America Intercollegiate Athletics Association) (1994–2001)
1994	Washburn	2–8	2–7	8th	
1995	Washburn	4–6	3–6	T–7th	
1996	Washburn	4–6	4–5	7th	
1997	Washburn	3–8	2–7	8th	
1998	Washburn	4–7	3–6	T–6th	
1999	Washburn	6–5	4–5	T–5th	
2000	Washburn	5–6	3–6	6th	
2001	Washburn	3–8	2–7	9th	
Washburn:		31–54	23–49		
Charleston Golden Eagles (West Virginia Intercollegiate Athletic Conference) (2005–2010)
2005	Charleston	8–3	6–2	3rd	
2006	Charleston	5–6	4–3	T–3rd	
2007	Charleston	8–3	6–2	T–2nd	
2008	Charleston	7–4	5–3	T–4th	
2009	Charleston	9–2	6–2	T–2nd	
2010	Charleston	6–5	4–4	T–5th	
Charleston:		43–23	31–16		
Total:		137–108–4			
