= Dick Godlove =

American coach and college athletics administrator

Biographical details
- Born: January 24, 1905; Lime Creek Township, Cerro Gordo County, Iowa, U.S.
- Died: September 15, 1985 (aged 80); Topeka, Kansas, U.S.

Coaching career (HC unless noted)

Football
- 1936–1942: Ottawa (KS)
- 1946–1958: Washburn

Basketball
- 1936–1943: Ottawa (KS)
- 1960: Washburn (interim HC)

Administrative career (AD unless noted)
- 1944–1964: Washburn

Head coaching record
- Overall: 104–55–10 (football)

Accomplishments and honors

Championships
- Football; 2 KCAC (1938–1939); 3 CIAC (1949, 1953–1954)

Awards
- NAIA Hall of Fame

Richard Milan Godlove (January 24, 1905 – September 15, 1985) was an American college football and college basketball coach and athletics administrator. He served as the head football coach at Ottawa University in Ottawa, Kansas from 1936 to 1942 and Washburn University in Topeka, Kansas from 1946 to 1968, compiling a career college football head coaching record of 104–55–10. In 1964, he was inducted into the National Association of Intercollegiate Athletics Hall of Fame and served as the third president of the organization.

== Coaching career ==
=== Ottawa ===
In January 1936, Godlove was named the 14th head football coach at the Ottawa University in Ottawa, Kansas and he held that position for seven seasons, from 1936 to 1942, compiling a record of 37–13–6.

The school inducted him into their athletic hall of fame in 1991.

=== Washburn ===
After Ottawa, Godlove was named the 25th head football coach at Washburn University in Topeka, Kansas, serving for 13 seasons, from 1946 to 1958, and compiling a record of 67–42–4.

During his first year at Washburn, Godlove, alongside Fran Welch of Kansas State Teachers, coached an "all-star" team made up of Kansas players that played a similar squad from Missouri in the "Mo-Kan Bowl" all-star exhibition game.

After coaching at Washburn, he remained as the school's athletic director while Ralph Brown succeeded him as head football coach.

== Death ==
Godlove died at Topeka in 1985.

== Head coaching record ==
=== Football ===
Year	Team	Overall	Conference	Standing	Bowl/playoffs
Ottawa Braves (Kansas Collegiate Athletic Conference) (1936–1942)
1936	Ottawa	3–4–2	1–2–2	4th	
1937	Ottawa	5–2	2–2	4th	
1938	Ottawa	8–0	5–0	1st	
1939	Ottawa	6–1–1	5–0–1	1st	
1940	Ottawa	4–4–1	3–2–1	3rd	
1941	Ottawa	6–1–1	4–1–1	T–2nd	
1942	Ottawa	5–1–1	4–1–1	2nd	
Ottawa:		37–13–6	24–8–6		
Washburn Ichabods (Central Intercollegiate Conference) (1946–1958)
1946	Washburn	6–2–1	3–1–1	2nd	
1947	Washburn	7–1	4–1	2nd	
1948	Washburn	3–5–1	2–2–1	4th	
1949	Washburn	7–2	5–1	T–1st	
1950	Washburn	3–4–1	2–2–1	3rd	
1951	Washburn	6–3	3–2	3rd	
1952	Washburn	4–5	3–2	T–2nd	
1953	Washburn	7–1	4–1	T–1st	
1954	Washburn	6–2	4–1	T–1st	
1955	Washburn	6–2–1	4–1	2nd	
1956	Washburn	3–6	3–2	4th	
1957	Washburn	5–4	2–3	4th	
1958	Washburn	4–5	2–3	5th	
Washburn:		67–42–4	41–22–3		
Total:		104–55–10			
National championship Conference title Conference division title or championship game berth
