= Paul Coldren =

American football player and coach

Biographical details
- Born: August 29, 1874; Iowa, U.S.

Playing career
- 1895–1896: Iowa
- Position: Quarterback

Coaching career (HC unless noted)
- 1897–1898: Washburn
- 1900: Simpson (IA)
- 1902–1904: Augustana (IL)

Head coaching record
- Overall: 25–9–4

Paul Alfred Coldren (August 29, 1874 – ?) was an American college football player and coach. He served as the head football coach at Washburn University from 1897 to 1898, at Simpson College in 1900, and at Augustana College in Rock Island, Illinois from 1902 to 1905, compiling a career coaching record of 25–9–4. Coldren played football as a quarterback at the University of Iowa.

== Coaching career ==
Coldren was the third head football coach for Washburn University in Topeka, Kansas, serving for two seasons, from 1897 to 1898, and compiling a record of 11–1–1.

== Head coaching record ==
Year	Team	Overall	Conference	Standing	Bowl/playoffs
Washburn Ichabods (Independent) (1897–1898)
1897	Washburn	7–1			
1898	Washburn	4–0–1			
Washburn:		11–1–1			
Simpson Red and Gold (Independent) (1900)
1900	Simpson	6–2–1			
Simpson:		6–2–1			
Augustana (Illinois) Vikings (Independent) (1902–1904)
1902	Augustana	2–2			
1903	Augustana	2–2–1			
1904	Augustana	4–2–1			
Augustana (IL):		8–6–2			
Total:		25–9–4			
