= Zach Watkins =

American football coach (born 1987)

Current position
- Title: Head coach
- Team: Washburn
- Conference: MIAA
- Record: 3–8

Biographical details
- Born: January 31, 1987 (age 39); Independence, Missouri, U.S.
- Education: Washburn University (2009); Fort Hays State University (2013)

Playing career
- 2006–2009: Washburn
- Position: Linebacker

Coaching career (HC unless noted)
- 2010: Northwest Missouri State (GA)
- 2011: Fort Hays State (ILB)
- 2012–2013: Fort Hays State (ST/DL)
- 2014–2024: Washburn (co-DC/DB)
- 2025–present: Washburn

Head coaching record
- Overall: 3–8

Zachary Elias Watkins (born January 31, 1987) is an American college football coach. He is the head football coach for Washburn University, a position he has held since November 2024. He also coached for Northwest Missouri State and Fort Hays State. He played college football for Washburn as a linebacker.

== Head coaching record ==
Year	Team	Overall	Conference	Standing	Bowl/playoffs
Washburn Ichabods (Mid-America Intercollegiate Athletics Association) (2025–present)
2025	Washburn	3–8	2–7	T–8th	
Washburn:		3–8	2–7		
Total:		3–8			
