= Aztec Bowl (game) =

College football bowl game

The Aztec Bowl (Spanish: Tazón Azteca) is an NCAA-sanctioned college division/minor (prior to 1997); AFCA Division III (since 1997) Division II/III (since 2011) post-season bowl game that has been played intermittently since 1947, traditionally in mid-December. From 1947 to 1949 the event was called the Silver Bowl, and in 1950 the name was changed to the Aztec Bowl.

== History ==
The inaugural Silver Bowl was played in Mexico City on December 19, 1947. A Mexican college all-star team defeated Randolph Field Air Base by a score of 24–19. Randolph Field featured Doc Blanchard and Arnold Tucker, with the former accusing the Mexican team of fielding American ringers. However, according to Wilbur "Bud" Fellows of Mexico City College: "There were only two Americans on the Mexican squad–myself and Morris Williams, a tackle from Washington, D. C. It just happens that football has developed in Mexico and there are now some pretty fair native players."

With but one exception, all editions of the bowl game have been played in Mexico; the exception was the 1957 game played in San Antonio, Texas. From 1997 to 2008, under sponsorship of the American Football Coaches Association, the bowl featured a team of Division III All-Stars against a team of Mexican All-Stars. 360 Sports Events Division II/III All-American Eagles took over sponsoring players, along with ONEFA in 2010.

The 1970 and 1980 editions are considered junior college bowl games, and games played in 1947, 1948, 1952, and 1996 are considered military bowl games. No games were played in 1954–1956, 1958–1963, 1967–1969, 1972–1978, 1981–1983, 1985, and 1995.

Under the new format there were no games in 2008 and 2010 because of lack of sponsors. The Aztec Bowl returned in 2011 in Chihuahua. There was no game in 2013 because of venue issues in Mexico.

The Aztec Bowl has always been an International Bowl Game, however in 1997 the Aztec Bowl was re-formed into a Bowl Game between Small College All-Stars from the United States and Mexico, billed as Team USA vs. Team Mexico.

== Game results ==
Date played	Winning team	Result	Losing team	Venue	Bowl Games I - XLIV	Ref.
December 19, 1947	Mexico All-Stars	24–19	(United States) Randolph Field Air Base	Mexico City	Military Bowl Game - I	
December 11, 1948	(United States) San Diego Marines	33–26	Mexico All-Stars	Mexico City	Military Bowl Game - II	
December 17, 1949	(United States) Trinity University	52–6	Mexico All-Stars	Mexico City	College Bowl Game - III	
December 23, 1950	(United States) Whittier Poets	27–14	Mexico All-Stars	Mexico City	College Division Bowl Game - IV	
December 22, 1951	(United States) Sul Ross State Lobos	41–40	Mexico All-Stars	Mexico City	College Division Bowl Game - V	
December 20, 1952	(United States) Hamilton Air Force Base	55–33	Mexico All-Stars	Mexico City	Military Bowl Game - VI	
December 19, 1953	Mexico All-Stars	45–26	(United States) Eastern New Mexico Greyhounds	Mexico City	College Division Bowl Game - VII	
December 16, 1957	(United States) Wiley Wildcats	78–20	Mexico All-Stars	San Antonio, Texas	College Division Bowl Game - VIII	
November 28, 1964	Mexico All-Stars	20–7	(United States) UC Santa Barbara	Mexico City	College Division Bowl Game - IX	
December 14, 1965	Mexico All-Stars	28–6	(United States) San Diego Sabres	Mexico City	All-Star Bowl Game - X	
December 13, 1966	(United States) Tarleton State Texans	42–8	Mexico All-Stars	Mexico City	College Division Bowl Game - XI	
December 10, 1970	Mexico All-Stars	7–6	(United States) Mesabi State Junior College	Mexico City	Junior College Bowl Game - XII	
December 20, 1971	(United States) Navy Freshmen	47–9	Mexico All-Stars	Mexico City	College Division Bowl Game - XIII	
December 9, 1979	Mexico All-Stars	8–0	(United States) Trinity Tigers	Mexico City	Division III Bowl Game - XIV	
December 13, 1980	Mexico All-Stars	28–17	(United States) La Mesa Junior College	Mexico City	Junior College Bowl Game - XV	
December 15, 1984	Mexico All-Stars	22–15	(United States) Tarleton State Texans	Mexico City	Division III Bowl Game - XVI	
December 20, 1986	(United States) Washburn Ichabods	27–8	Mexico All-Stars	Mexico City	Division III Bowl Game - XVII	
December 14, 1987	(United States) Adams State Indians	35–17	Mexico All-Stars	Mexico City	Division III Bowl Game - XVIII	
December 10, 1988	Mexico All-Stars	49–21	(United States) Western New Mexico Mustangs	Mexico City	Division III Bowl Game - XIX	
December 9, 1989	(United States) Southeastern Oklahoma State Savages	22–0	Mexico All-Stars	Mexico City	Division III Bowl Game - XX	
December 12, 1990	(United States) Southern Arkansas Muleriders	41–29	Mexico All-Stars	Mexico City	Division III Bowl Game - XXI	
December 15, 1991	Mexico All-Stars	35–28	(United States) Southwestern Oklahoma State Bulldogs	Mexico City	NAIA Bowl Game - XXII	
December 14, 1992	(United States) Arkansas-Monticello Boll Weevils	21–14	Mexico All-Stars	Mexico City	Division III Bowl Game - XXIII	
December 18, 1993	Mexico All-Stars	34–20	(United States) McMurry Indians	Mexico City	Division III Bowl Game - XXIV	
December 17, 1994	Mexico All-Stars	24–24	(United States) Southeastern Oklahoma State Savages	Mexico City	Division III Bowl Game - XXV	
December 19, 1996	Mexico All-Stars	63–8	Palermo (Italy) Cardinals	Mexico City	Military Bowl Game - XXVI	
December 20, 1997	(United States) AFCA Division III All-Stars	42–41	Mexico All-Stars	Toluca	All-Star Bowl Game - XXVII	
December 12, 1998	(United States) AFCA Division III All-Stars	40–13	Mexico All-Stars	Monterrey	All-Star Bowl Game - XXVIII	
December 18, 1999	(United States) AFCA Division III All-Stars	44–13	Mexico All-Stars	Mexico City	All-Star Bowl Game - XXIX	
December 16, 2000	(United States) AFCA Division III All-Stars	27–26	Mexico All-Stars	Mérida	All-Star Bowl Game - XXX	
December 15, 2001	(United States) AFCA Division III All-Stars	37–5	Mexico All-Stars	Saltillo	All-Star Bowl Game - XXXI	
December 14, 2002	(United States) AFCA Division III All-Stars	15–9	Mexico All-Stars	Torreón	All-Star Bowl Game - XXXII	
December 13, 2003	Mexico All-Stars	34–31	(United States) AFCA Division III All-Stars	Cancún	All-Star Bowl Game - XXXIII	
December 11, 2004	(United States) AFCA Division III All-Stars	23–3	Mexico All-Stars	Cancún	All-Star Bowl Game - XXXIV	
December 17, 2005	(United States) AFCA Division III All-Stars	53–15	Mexico All-Stars	Toluca	All-Star Bowl Game - XXXV	
December 17, 2006	(United States) AFCA Division III All-Stars	28–7	Mexico All-Stars	Aguascalientes	All-Star Bowl Game - XXXVI	
December 8, 2007	(United States) AFCA Division III All-Stars	37–19	Mexico All-Stars	Chihuahua	All-Star Bowl Game - XXXVII	
December 5, 2009	Mexico All-Stars	42–17	(United States) Central Methodist Eagles	Mexico City	All-Star Bowl Game - XXXVIII	
December 10, 2011	(United States) Division II/III All-American Eagles	28–14	ONEFA Mexico All-Stars	Chihuahua	All-Star Bowl Game - XXXIX	
December 14, 2012	(United States) Division II/III All-American Eagles	49–26	ONEFA Mexico All-Stars	Monterrey	All-Star Bowl Game - XL	
November 29, 2014	(United States) Division II/III All-American Eagles	24–21	ONEFA Mexico All-Stars	Chihuahua	All-Star Bowl Game - XLI	
December 5, 2015	ONEFA Mexico All-Stars	17–14	(United States) Division II/III All-American Eagles	Mexico City	All-Star Bowl Game - XLII	
December 9, 2016	ONEFA Mexico All-Stars	27–19	(United States) Division II/III All-American Eagles	Monterrey	All-Star Bowl Game - XLIII	
December 9, 2017	ONEFA Mexico All-Stars	34–24	(United States) Division II/III All-American Eagles	Texcoco	All-Star Bowl Game - XLIV	
December 8, 2018	ONEFA Mexico All-Stars	17–10	(United States) Division II/III All-American Eagles	Mexico City	All-Star Bowl Game - XLV	
December 11, 2022	ONEFA Mexico All-Stars	27–2	(United States) Texas All-Stars/Air Radar Tour	Texcoco	All-Star Bowl Game - XLVII	
December 1, 2023	ONEFA Mexico All-Stars	56–0	(United States) Division II/III All-American Eagles	Monterrey	All-Star Bowl Game - XLVIII	

== See also ==
- List of college bowl games
- IFAF U-19 World Cup
- World University American Football Championship
