= Washburn Ichabods =

- University: Washburn University
- Conference: The MIAA
- NCAA: Division II
- Athletic director: Loren Ferré
- Location: Topeka, Kansas
- Varsity teams: 16
- Football stadium: Yager Stadium at Moore Bowl
- Basketball arena: Lee Arena
- Baseball stadium: Falley Field
- Mascot: Ichabod Washburn
- Nickname: Ichabods
- Colors: Yale blue and white
- Website: wusports.com

The Washburn Ichabods are the athletic teams that represent Washburn University, located in Topeka, Kansas, in intercollegiate sports as a member of the NCAA Division II ranks, primarily competing in the Mid-America Intercollegiate Athletics Association (MIAA) since the 1989–90 academic year. The Ichabods previously competed in the Central States Intercollegiate Conference (CSIC) of the National Association of Intercollegiate Athletics (NAIA) from 1976–77 to 1988–89; in the Great Plains Athletic Conference (GPAC) from 1972–73 to 1975–76; in the Rocky Mountain Athletic Conference (RMAC) from 1968–69 to 1971–72; in the Central Intercollegiate Athletic Conference (CIC) from 1940–41 to 1967–68 (which they were a member on a previous stint from 1923–24 to 1932–33); as an Independent from 1933–34 to 1939–40; and in the Kansas Collegiate Athletic Conference (KCAC) from 1902–03 to 1922–23.

== Nickname ==
The "Ichabods" nickname is named after the university's contributor Ichabod Washburn, who was also the founder of Worcester Polytechnic Institute. Prior to the 2013–14 season, the women's athletic teams were known as the "Lady Blues". On May 24, 2013, the Lady Blues nickname was dropped. President Farley stated that "From the moment a student arrives on campus, until the time they graduate and are alumni, they are "Ichabods", not a "Lady Blue"."

== Varsity teams ==
Washburn competes in 16 intercollegiate varsity sports: Men's sports include baseball, basketball, cross country, football, golf, tennis and track & field (indoor and outdoor); while women's sports include basketball, cross country, soccer, softball, tennis, track & field (indoor and outdoor) and volleyball.

MIAA logo in Washburn's color

| Men's sports | Women's sports |
|---|---|
| Baseball | Basketball |
| Basketball | Cross country |
| Cross country | Soccer |
| Football | Softball |
| Golf | Tennis |
| Tennis | Track and field^{†} |
| Track and field^{†} | Volleyball |
† – Track and field includes both indoor and outdoor

=== Basketball ===
==== Men's ====
Washburn claims one national championship. Washburn won five straight games to claim the 1925 AAU National Championship, becoming the fourth school to claim an AAU title (joining Utah (1916), N.Y.U. (1920), and Butler (1924). They defeated St. Phillips Athletic Club, 34–11, in the final. In 1987, the Washburn men's basketball team defeated West Virginia State 79–77 to win the NAIA national championship at Kemper Arena in Kansas City.

==== Women's ====
Coached by Ron McHenry from 2000 to 2022, the Ichabods posted a record of 35–2, setting a school record for wins and capturing the NCAA Women's Division II Basketball National Championship by defeating Seattle Pacific University 70–53.

=== Football ===
Washburn began playing Football in 1891 with a record of 1 win and 4 losses. In 1907, under Garfield Weede the team completed a perfect season of 8 wins and 0 losses to be declared champions of the Kansas Conference, forerunner to the Kansas Collegiate Athletic Conference. The program has won 8 conference championships in its history.

The current head coach is Craig Schurig, who has held the position since the start of the 2002 season and led his team to a victory in the Mineral Water Bowl in 2004. Former coaches at Washburn include John H. Outland, Garfield Weede, Bert Kennedy, Dick Godlove, Ellis Rainsberger, Harold "Bud" Elliott, Tony DeMeo.

== Notable alumni ==
Washburn's mascot, the Ichabod

- Brian Folkerts – NFL and AFL offensive lineman
- Mal Stevens – College Football Hall of Famer
- Cary Williams – Philadelphia Eagles cornerback and Super Bowl XLVII champion with Baltimore Ravens
- Michael Wilhoite – Seattle Seahawks Linebacker
- Corey Ballentine – New York Giants Defensive Back
- Thomas Huber – LTV Steel
- Lee Wykoff – St. Louis All-Stars fullback/halfback and professional wrestler
