= Craig Schurig =

American football player and coach (born 1965)

Current position
- Title: Tight ends coach
- Team: North Alabama
- Conference: UAC

Biographical details
- Born: March 2, 1965 (age 60); Willingboro, New Jersey, U.S.

Playing career
- 1983–1986: Colorado Mines
- Position: Defensive back

Coaching career (HC unless noted)
- 1992: Colorado Mines (RB)
- 1993–1995: Pittsburg State (TE)
- 1996–2001: Pittsburg State (ST/DB)
- 2002–2024: Washburn
- 2025: North Alabama (QB)
- 2026–present: North Alabama (TE)

Head coaching record
- Overall: 141–110
- Bowls: 3–1
- Tournaments: 1–4 (NCAA D-II playoffs)

Accomplishments and honors

Championships
- 1 MIAA (2005)

Awards
- MIAA Coach of the Year (2005); AFCA Region 3 Coach of the Year (2005)

Craig Schurig (born March 2, 1965) is an American college football coach and former player. He is the tight ends coach for the University of North Alabama, a position he has held since 2026. He was the head football coach for Washburn University from 2002 to 2024. He is the 40th person to hold the post. He is known for turning around a once-losing program into a winning program. As of the 2013 Washburn University budget, Schurig's salary is listed as $101,303.

Schurig led the Washburn football program to a win in the 2004 Mineral Water Bowl. The Ichabods posted their first NCAA Division II playoff appearance and their first Mid-America Intercollegiate Athletics Association (MIAA) championship in 2005. The conference championship was the first for the Ichabods since the 1983 season. Schurig earned the MIAA Coach of the Year honors for his efforts leading the Ichabods that season. He was also named the AFCA's Region 3 Coach of the Year.

Prior to becoming the Washburn head coach, Schurig spent nine years as an assistant coach under Chuck Broyles at Pittsburg State University.

== Personal life ==
Schurig grew up in Willingboro Township, New Jersey. He graduated in 1987 with a bachelor's degree in petroleum engineering from Colorado School of Mines and went on to earn a master's degree in physical education at Pittsburg State University in 1996. He lives in Topeka, Kansas with his wife, a daughter, and two sons.

== Head coaching record ==
Year	Team	Overall	Conference	Standing	Bowl/playoffs	AFCA^{#}
Washburn Ichabods (Mid-America Intercollegiate Athletics Association) (2002–2024)
2002	Washburn	3–8	3–6	T–6th		
2003	Washburn	5–6	3–6	7th		
2004	Washburn	8–4	6–3	3rd	W Mineral Water	
2005	Washburn	9–3	7–1	1st	L NCAA Division II Second Round	13
2006	Washburn	7–4	6–3	4th		
2007	Washburn	8–4	7–2	2nd	L NCAA Division II First Round	24
2008	Washburn	6–5	4–5	6th		
2009	Washburn	8–3	6–3	2nd		25
2010	Washburn	8–4	6–3	3rd	W Kanza	
2011	Washburn	10–3	7–2	2nd	L NCAA Division II Second Round	11
2012	Washburn	7–4	7–4	6th		
2013	Washburn	8–3	7–3	T–4th		
2014	Washburn	4–7	4–7	T–7th		
2015	Washburn	5–6	5–6	8th		
2016	Washburn	7–5	7–4	T–4th	L Mineral Water	
2017	Washburn	7–5	6–5	T–6th	W C.H.A.M.P.S. Heart of Texas	
2018	Washburn	5–6	5–6	T–7th		
2019	Washburn	6–5	6–5	T–5th		
2020–21	No team—COVID-19					
2021	Washburn	9–3	9–2	T–2nd	L NCAA Division II First Round	25
2022	Washburn	7–4	7–4	5th		
2023	Washburn	1–10	0–10	11th		
2024	Washburn	3–8	2–7	T–8th		
Washburn:		141–110	120–97			
Total:		141–110				
National championship Conference title Conference division title or championship game berth
^{#}Rankings from final AFCA poll.
