= Great Plains Athletic Conference (1972–1976) =

- Association: NAIA
- Founded: 1972
- Ceased: 1976
- Region: Mountain States

The Great Plains Athletic Conference (GPAC) was a college athletic conference affiliated with the National Association of Intercollegiate Athletics (NAIA), operated in the western United States. It was aligned with the Rocky Mountain Athletic Conference (RMAC). The two allied conferences worked under the name of the Mountain and Plains Intercollegiate Athletic Association (MPIAA). It was announced on May 15, 1972. The founding schools were Fort Hays State College (now Fort Hays State University); Kansas State College of Emporia (now Emporia State University); Kansas State College of Pittsburg (now Pittsburg State University); Southern Colorado State College (now Colorado State University–Pueblo); the University of Nebraska at Omaha, the University of Northern Colorado and Washburn University. The conference only lasted four years, as Nebraska–Omaha and Northern Colorado left for the North Central Conference (NCC), Southern Colorado went back to the RMAC, and the rest of the schools started the Central States Intercollegiate Conference (CSIC), which merged into the Mid-America Intercollegiate Athletics Association (MIAA) effective in the 1989–90 school year.

== Member schools ==
=== Final members ===
Institution	Location	Founded	Affiliation	Enrollment	Nickname	Joined (Note: Represents the calendar year when fall sports competition begins.)	Left (Note: Represents the calendar year when spring sports competition ends.)	Subsequent conference(s)	Current conference
Fort Hays State College (Note: Currently known as Fort Hays State University since 1977.)	Hays, Kansas	1902	Public	14,658	Tigers	1972	1976	Central States (CSIC) (1976–89); Rocky Mountain (RMAC) (Note: Currently an NCAA Division II athletic conference.) (1989–2006)	Mid-American (MIAA) (2006–present)
Kansas State College of Emporia (Note: Currently known as Emporia State University since 1977.)	Emporia, Kansas	1863	Public	5,887	Hornets	1972	1976	Central States (CSIC) (1976–89); D-II Independent (1989–91)	Mid-American (MIAA) (1991–present)
Kansas State College of Pittsburg (Note: Currently known as Pittsburg State University since 1977.)	Pittsburg, Kansas	1903	Public	7,102	Gorillas	1972	1976	Central States (CSIC) (1976–89)	Mid-American (MIAA) (1989–present)
University of Nebraska at Omaha	Omaha, Nebraska	1908	Public	15,431	Mavericks	1972	1976	various (Note: Nebraska–Omaha (now Omaha) had joined the following subsequent conferences: the North Central Conference (NCC) from 1976–77 to 2007–08; the Mid-America Intercollegiate Athletics Association (MIAA) from 2008–09 to 2010–11; and as an NCAA D-I Independent during the 2011–12 school year.)	Summit (Note: Currently an NCAA Division I non-football athletic conference.) (2012–present)
University of Northern Colorado	Greeley, Colorado	1889	Public	12,862	Bears	1972	1976	various (Note: Northern Colorado had joined the following subsequent conferences: as an NAIA/D-II Independent from 1976–77 to 1977–78; the North Central Conference (NCC) from 1978–79 to 2002–03; and as an NCAA D-I Independent from 2003–04 to 2005–06.)	Big Sky (Note: Currently an NCAA Division I Football Championship Subdivision (FCS) athletic conference.) (2006–present)
Southern Colorado State College (Note: Later known as the University of Southern Colorado in 1975, now currently known as Colorado State University–Pueblo since 2003.)	Pueblo, Colorado	1933	Public	6,805	ThunderWolves	1972	1976	Rocky Mountain (RMAC) (1976–90); Colorado (CAC) (1990–96)	Rocky Mountain (RMAC) (1996–present)
Washburn University	Topeka, Kansas	1865	Public	7,971	Ichabods	1972	1976	Central States (CSIC) (1976–89)	Mid-American (MIAA) (1989–present)

== Football champions ==
- 1972 – Emporia State
- 1973 – Emporia State and Northern Colorado
- 1974 – Northern Colorado
- 1975 – Northern Colorado
