= Central Intercollegiate Conference =

American intercollegiate athletic conference (1928-1968)

The Central Intercollegiate Conference (CIC) was an American intercollegiate athletic conference that operated from 1928 to 1968. It was less often referred to as the Central Intercollegiate Athletic Conference (CIAC), particularly towards the beginning of its existence. Formed in late 1927, the conference initially had seven members, all located in the state of Kansas, and began play in early 1928. Many of the league's members went on to form the Central States Intercollegiate Conference (CSIC) in 1976.

== Member schools ==
=== Final members ===
Institution	Location	Affiliation	Enrollment	Nickname	Joined (Note: Although the initial school year was 1927–28 for the debut of the CIC, the conference was founded in December 1927, yet competition for certain winter and spring sports began as in early 1928.) (Note: Represents the calendar year when fall sports competition begins.)	Left (Note: Represents the calendar year when spring sports competition ends.)	Subsequent conference	Current conference
Kansas State Teachers College (Note: Currently known as Emporia State University since 1977.)	Emporia, Kansas	Public	5,887	Hornets	1927	1968	various (Note: Emporia State had joined various subsequent conference affiliations: the Rocky Mountain Athletic Conference (RMAC) from 1968–69 to 1971–72; the Great Plains Athletic Conference (GPAC) from 1972–73 to 1975–76; the Central States Intercollegiate Conference (CSIC) from 1976–77 to 1988–89; and as an NCAA D-II Independent from 1989–90 to 1990–91.)	Mid-America (MIAA) (Note: Currently an NCAA Division II athletic conference.) (1991–present)
Kansas State Teachers College in Hays (Note: Currently known as Fort Hays State University since 1977.)	Hays, Kansas	Public	14,658	Tigers	1927	1968	various (Note: Fort Hays State had joined various subsequent conference affiliations: the Rocky Mountain Athletic Conference (RMAC) from 1968–69 to 1971–72 (also from 1989–90 to 2005–06 on its second stint); the Great Plains Athletic Conference (GPAC) from 1972–73 to 1975–76; and the Central States Intercollegiate Conference (CSIC) from 1976–77 to 1988–89.)	Mid-America (MIAA) (2006–present)
Kansas State Teachers College in Pittsburg (Note: Currently known as Pittsburg State University since 1977.)	Pittsburg, Kansas	Public	7,102	Gorillas	1927	1968	various (Note: Pittsburg State had joined various subsequent conference affiliations: the Rocky Mountain Athletic Conference (RMAC) from 1968–69 to 1971–72; the Great Plains Athletic Conference (GPAC) from 1972–73 to 1975–76; and the Central States Intercollegiate Conference (CSIC) from 1976–77 to 1988–89.)	Mid-America (MIAA) (1989–present)
University of Omaha (Note: Currently known as the University of Nebraska at Omaha since 1968.)	Omaha, Nebraska	Public	15,431	Indians (Note: Nebraska–Omaha is now competing as the Mavericks since the 1971–72 school year.)	1959	1968	various (Note: Nebraska–Omaha had joined various subsequent conference affiliations: the Rocky Mountain Athletic Conference (RMAC) from 1968–69 to 1971–72; the Great Plains Athletic Conference (GPAC) from 1972–73 to 1975–76; the North Central Conference (NCC) from 1976–77 to 2007–08; the Mid-America Intercollegiate Athletics Association (MIAA) from 2008–09 to 2010–11; and as an NCAA D-I Independent during the 2011–12 school year.)	Summit (Note: Currently an NCAA Division I non-football athletic conference.) (2012–present)
Washburn University	Topeka, Kansas	Public	7,971	Ichabods	1927, 1940	1933, 1968	various (Note: Washburn had joined various subsequent conference affiliations: as an Independent from 1933–34 to 1939–40; the Rocky Mountain Athletic Conference (RMAC) from 1968–69 to 1971–72; the Great Plains Athletic Conference (GPAC) from 1972–73 to 1975–76; and the Central States Intercollegiate Conference (CSIC) from 1976–77 to 1988–89.)	Mid-America (MIAA) (1989–present)

=== Former members ===
Institution	Location	Affiliation	Enrollment	Nickname	Joined (Note: Although the initial school year was 1927–28 for the debut of the CIC, the conference was founded in December 1927, yet competition for certain winter and spring sports began as in early 1928.) (Note: Represents the calendar year when fall sports competition begins.)	Left (Note: Represents the calendar year when spring sports competition ends.)	Subsequent conference	Current conference
College of Emporia	Emporia, Kansas	Presbyterian	N/A	Fighting Presbies	1927	1940	various (Note: The College of Emporia had joined various subsequent conference affiliations: the Kansas Collegiate Athletic Conference (KCAC) from 1940–41 to 1970–71; and the Heart of America Athletic Conference (HAAC) from 1971–72 to 1973–74.)	Closed in 1974
Rockhurst College (Note: Currently known as Rockhurst University since 1999.)	Kansas City, Missouri	Catholic (Jesuit)	2,746	Hawks	1948	1951	various (Note: Rockhurst had joined various subsequent conference affiliations: as an NAIA Independent from 1951–52 to 1997–98; as an NCAA D-II Independent during the 1998–99 school year; and the Heartland from 1999–2000 to 2004–05.)	Great Lakes Valley (GLVC) (Note: Currently an NCAA Division II athletic conference.) (2005–present)
St. Benedict's College (Note: Currently known as Benedictine College since 1971.)	Atchison, Kansas	Catholic (Benedictines)	2,189	Ravens	1937	1963	NAIA Independent (1963–91)	Heart of America (HAAC) (1991–present)
Southwestern College	Winfield, Kansas	United Methodist	1,650	Moundbuilders	1927	1958	Kansas (KCAC) (1958–present)	
Municipal University of Wichita (Note: Currently known as Wichita State University since 1964.)	Wichita, Kansas	Public	15,778	Shockers	1927	1940	various (Note: Wichita State had joined various subsequent conference affiliations: as an NAIA Independent from 1940–41 to 1944–45; and the Missouri Valley Conference from 1945–46 to 2016–17.)	The American (Note: Currently an NCAA Division I Football Bowl Subdivision athletic conference.) (2017–present)

=== Membership timeline ===
Full member (all sports) Full member (non-football) Associate member (football) Associate member (sport)

== Football champions ==
- 1928 – College of Emporia
- 1929 – Emporia Teachers
- 1930 – Washburn
- 1931 – Washburn and Wichita
- 1932 – Wichita
- 1933 – Wichita
- 1934 – Fort Hays State
- 1935 – Fort Hays State and Pittsburg State
- 1936 – Fort Hays State
- 1937 – Wichita
- 1938 – Wichita
- 1939 – Wichita
- 1940 – St. Benedict's
- 1941 – Pittsburg State
- 1942 – Pittsburg State
- 1943 – No champion
- 1944 – No champion
- 1945 – No champion
- 1946 – Southwestern (KS)
- 1947 – Emporia State
- 1948 – Emporia State
- 1949 – Pittsburg State and Washburn
- 1950 – Emporia State
- 1951 – Emporia State and Pittsburg State
- 1952 – Emporia State
- 1953 – St. Benedict's and Washburn
- 1954 – Fort Hays State and Washburn
- 1955 – Pittsburg State
- 1956 – St. Benedict's
- 1957 – Pittsburg State
- 1958 – St. Benedict's
- 1959 – St. Benedict's
- 1960 – St. Benedict's
- 1961 – Pittsburg State
- 1962 – Omaha
- 1963 – Omaha
- 1964 – Washburn
- 1965 – Omaha
- 1966 – Fort Hays State and Pittsburg State
- 1967 – Omaha
- 1968 – Nebraska–Omaha

== See also ==
- List of defunct college football conferences
