= Central States Intercollegiate Conference =

- Association: NAIA
- Founded: 1976
- Ceased: 1989
- Sports fielded: 8; men's: 6; women's: 6
- Division: I
- No. of teams: 8

The Central States Intercollegiate Conference (CSIC) was an American intercollegiate athletic conference affiliated with the National Association of Intercollegiate Athletics (NAIA) from 1976 to 1989. It was known to be one of the toughest NAIA conferences in the nation.

== History ==
In 1976, four members from the Great Plains Athletic Conference decided to move away from that conference, which was affiliated with the Rocky Mountain Athletic Conference and form the Central States Intercollegiate Conference (CSIC). Those were Fort Hays State College (now Fort Hays State University), Kansas State College of Emporia (now Emporia State University), Kansas State College of Pittsburg (now Pittsburg State University) and Washburn University. Other institutions who joined the CSIC were Kearney State College (now the University of Nebraska at Kearney) and Wayne State College, who competed in the Nebraska College Conference; and Missouri Southern State College (now Missouri Southern State University) and Missouri Western State College (now Missouri Southern State University), who competed as NAIA independents.

In 1987, all institutions in the CSIC applied for NCAA membership, with the announcement of four schools Missouri Southern, Missouri Western, Pittsburg State and Washburn already becoming a member of the Missouri Intercollegiate Athletics Association (MIAA, now the Mid-America Intercollegiate Athletics Association), effective beginning in the 1989–90 school year.

== Member schools ==
=== Final members ===
The CSIC consisted of eight members:

Institution	Location	Founded	Affiliation	Enrollment	Nickname	Joined	Left	Subsequent conference(s)	Current conference
Emporia State University (Note: Formerly known as Kansas State College of Emporia until 1977.)	Emporia, Kansas	1863	Public	5,887	Hornets & Lady Hornets	1976	1989	NAIA/D-II Independent (1989–91)	Mid-America (MIAA) (Note: Currently an NCAA Division II athletic conference.) (1991–present)
Fort Hays State College (Note: Formerly known as Fort Hays State College until 1977.)	Hays, Kansas	1902	Public	14,658	Tigers	1976	1989	Rocky Mountain (RMAC) (1989–2006)	Mid-America (MIAA) (2006–present)
Missouri Southern State University (Note: Formerly known as Missouri Southern State College until 2003.)	Joplin, Missouri	1937	Public	6,229	Lions	1976	1989	Mid-America (MIAA) (1989–present)	
Missouri Western State University (Note: Formerly known as Missouri Western State College until 2005.)	St. Joseph, Missouri	1915	Public	5,388	Griffons	1976	1989	Mid-America (MIAA) (1989–present)	
University of Nebraska at Kearney (Note: Formerly known as Kearney State College until 1991.)	Kearney, Nebraska	1905	Public	7,504	Lopers	1976	1989	Rocky Mountain (RMAC) (1989–90; (Note: Provisional member status.) 1994–2012); NAIA/D-II Independent (1990–94)	Mid-America (MIAA) (2012–present)
Pittsburg State University (Note: Formerly known as Kansas State College of Pittsburg until 1977.)	Pittsburg, Kansas	1903	Public	7,102	Gorillas	1976	1989	Mid-America (MIAA) (1989–present)	
Washburn University	Topeka, Kansas	1865	Public	7,971	Ichabods & Lady Blues	1976	1989	Mid-America (MIAA) (1989–present)	
Wayne State College	Wayne, Nebraska	1910	Public	4,202	Wildcats	1976	1989	Rocky Mountain (RMAC) (1989–90); NAIA/D-II Independent (1990–98)	Northern Sun (NSIC) (1998–present)

== Sports ==
Conference sports
Sport	Men's	Women's
Baseball	✓	
Basketball	✓	✓
Cross Country	✓	✓
Football	✓	
Soccer	✓	✓
Softball		✓
Track & Field	✓	✓
Volleyball		✓
