= Washburn Ichabods football =

College football program

- First season: 1890; 136 years ago
- Athletic director: Loren Ferré
- Head coach: Zach Watkins; 1st season, 0–0 (–)
- Location: Topeka, Kansas
- Stadium: Yager Stadium at Moore Bowl (capacity: 7,200)
- NCAA division: Division II
- Conference: MIAA
- Colors: Yale blue and white
- All-time record: 579–616–44 (.485)
- Bowl record: 5–5 (.500)

Conference championships
- 12
- Rivalries: Emporia State
- Fight song: "For Washburn and Her Team"
- Mascot: The Ichabod
- Marching band: Marching Blues
- Outfitter: Adidas
- Website: www.wusports.com

The Washburn Ichabods football program represents Washburn University in college football. They participate in Division II sports within the NCAA. The team plays their home games in Yager Stadium at Moore Bowl, located on the Washburn campus in Topeka, Kansas.

Washburn's football program dates back to 1890. The Ichabods claimed one MIAA conference championship in 2005, but 12 conference championships all together. Under Craig Schurig, the Ichabods have appeared in the Division II playoffs in 2005, 2007, and 2011; and competed in bowl games in 2004, 2010, 2016, and 2017.

== History ==
=== Schurig era ===
Year	Coach	Overall	Conference	Standing	Bowl/playoffs	Coaches^{#}	AP^{°}
Craig Schurig (Mid-America Intercollegiate Athletics Association) (2007–present)
2002	Craig Schurig	3–8	3–6	6th			
2003	Craig Schurig	5–6	3–6	6th			
2004	Craig Schurig	8–4	6–3	3rd	W Mineral Water Bowl		
2005	Craig Schurig	9–3	7–1	1st	L NCAA Div. II Playoffs	#13	
2006	Craig Schurig	7–4	6–3	4th			
2007	Craig Schurig	8–4	7–2	2nd	L NCAA Div. II Playoffs	#24	
2008	Craig Schurig	6–5	4–5	6th			
2009	Craig Schurig	8–3	6–3	2nd		#25	
2010	Craig Schurig	8–4	6–3	3rd	W Kanza Bowl		
2011	Craig Schurig	10–3	7–2	2nd	L NCAA Div. II Playoffs	#11	
2012	Craig Schurig	7–4	7–4	6th			
2013	Craig Schurig	8–3	7–3	3rd			
2014	Craig Schurig	4–7	4–7	T–7th			
2015	Craig Schurig	5–6	5–6	8th			
2016	Craig Schurig	7–5	7–4	T–4th	L Mineral Water Bowl		
2017	Craig Schurig	6–5	6–5	T–6th	W C.H.A.M.P.S. Heart of Texas Bowl		
2018	Craig Schurig	5-6	5–6	7th			
2019	Craig Schurig	6-5	6–5	T–6th			
2020	Craig Schurig	0-0	0–0	n/a	*NCAA Div. II Football Season Cancelled Due to COVID-19 Pandemic		
2021	Craig Schurig	9-3	9–2	T–2nd	L NCAA Div. II Playoffs	#19	
2022	Craig Schurig	7–4	7–4	5th			
2023	Craig Schurig	1–10	0–10	11th			
2023	Craig Schurig	3–8	2–7	T–8th			
Craig Schurig:		142–111	120–99				
Total:		142–111					
National championship Conference title Conference division title or championship game berth
^{#}Rankings from final Coaches Poll.

== Postseason appearances ==
=== NCAA Division II ===
The Ichabods have made five appearances in the NCAA Division II playoffs, with a combined record of 1–5.

Year	Round	Opponent	Result
2005	Second Round	NW Missouri State	L, 32–42
2007	First Round	West Texas A&M	L, 39–40
2011	First Round; Second Round	Abilene Christian; Pittsburg State	W, 52–49; L, 22–31
2021	First Round	Harding	L, 14–30
2026	First Round	Harding	L, 31–58

=== Bowl games ===
Year	Bowl Game	Opponent	Result
1974	Boot Hill Bowl	Millkin	W 21–7
1976	Mineral Water Bowl	Benedictine	L 14–29
1986	Aztec Bowl	Mexican All-Stars	W 27–8
1988	NAIA Playoffs	Arkansas–Monticello	W 27–8
2004	Mineral Water Bowl	Northern State	W 36–33
2010	Kanza Bowl	Midwestern State	W 45–14
2016	Mineral Water Bowl	Bemidji State	L 23–36
2017	C.H.A.M.P.S. Heart of Texas Bowl	Angelo State	W 41–25

== Championships ==
=== Conference championships ===
Year	Conference	Coach	Overall Record	Conference Record
1903	Kansas Conference	A. R. Kennedy	7–0–1	4–0–1
1907	Kansas Conference	Garfield Weede	8–0	5–0
1914	Kansas Conference	Glen Gray	5–3	
1921	Kansas Conference	Dwight Ream	3–5–1	
1930	Central Intercollegiate Athletic Conference	Ernest Bearg	7–2	
1931	Central Intercollegiate Athletic Conference	Ernest Bearg	7–3	
1949	Central Intercollegiate Athletic Conference	Dick Godlove	7–2	
1953	Central Intercollegiate Athletic Conference	Dick Godlove	7–1	
1954	Central Intercollegiate Athletic Conference	Dick Godlove	6–2	
1964	Central Intercollegiate Athletic Conference	Ellis Rainsberger	8–1	4–0
1983	Central States Intercollegiate Conference	George Tardiff	8–2	6–1
2005	Mid-America Intercollegiate Athletics Association	Craig Schurig	9–3	7–1
Total Conference Championships:			12	

== All-time record vs. current MIAA teams ==
Official record (including any NCAA imposed vacates and forfeits) against all current MIAA opponents as of the end of the 2015 season:

Opponent	Won	Lost	Tied	Percentage	Streak	First Meeting
Central Missouri	18	27	2	.404	Won 1	1902
Central Oklahoma	3	4	0	.429	Lost 1	2011
Emporia State	52	56	6	.482	Lost 3	1899
Fort Hays State	44	25	3	.638	Lost 1	1919
Lindenwood	4	2	0	.667	Won 4	2012
Missouri Southern	25	20	1	.554	Won 3	1970
Missouri Western	18	24	2	.432	Won 3	1972
Nebraska–Kearney	11	14	0	.440	Won 8	1963
Northeastern State	7	1	0	.875	Won 6	1987
Northwest Missouri State	6	31	0	.162	Lost 14	1944
Pittsburg State	24	63	1	.278	Won 1	1921
Totals	212	267	15	.444		

== Stadium ==
The Ichabods have played their home games in Yager Stadium since 1928.

== Notable players ==
- Pierre Desir - NFL cornerback
- Brian Folkerts – NFL and AFL offensive lineman
- Mal Stevens – College Football Hall of Famer
- Cary Williams – Super Bowl XLVII champion with the Baltimore Ravens
- Michael Wilhoite - NFL and UFL linebacker. Played five years with the San Francisco 49ers (2012–2016) and in March 2017 he signed with the Seattle Seahawks.
- Corey Ballentine – drafted in the 6th round of the 2019 NFL draft
- Kyle Hinton – drafted in the 7th round of the 2020 NFL draft
