= List of Southwestern Moundbuilders head football coaches =

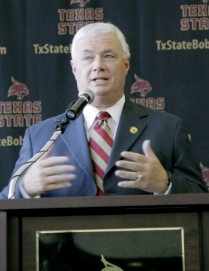
Dennis Franchione served as head coach of the Southwestern Moundbuilders from 1981 to 1982.

The Southwestern College Moundbuilders program is a college football team that represents Southwestern College in the Kansas Collegiate Athletic Conference, a part of the NAIA. The team has had 28 head coaches since its first recorded football game in 1895. The current coach is Brad Griffin, who was announced on January 21, 2015 as the new head coach. Griffin replaces Ken Crandall who resigned at the conclusion of the 2014 season.

== Key ==
Key to symbols in coaches list
General		Overall		Conference		Postseason (Note: Although the first Rose Bowl Game was played in 1902, it has been continuously played since the 1916 game, and is recognized as the oldest bowl game by the NCAA. "—" indicates any season prior to 1916 when postseason games were not played.)	
No.	Order of coaches (Note: A running total of the number of head coaches, with coaches who served separate tenures being counted only once. Interim head coaches are represented with "Int" and are not counted in the running total. "—" indicates the team played but either without a coach or no coach is on record. "X" indicates an interim year without play.)	GC	Games coached	CW	Conference wins	PW	Postseason wins
DC	Division championships	OW	Overall wins	CL	Conference losses	PL	Postseason losses
CC	Conference championships	OL	Overall losses	CT	Conference ties	PT	Postseason ties
NC	National championships	OT	Overall ties (Note: Overtime rules in college football were introduced in 1996, making ties impossible in the period since.)	C%	Conference winning percentage		
†	Elected to the College Football Hall of Fame	O%	Overall winning percentage (Note: When computing the win–loss percentage, a tie counts as half a win and half a loss.)				

== Coaches ==
No.	Name	Term	GC	OW	OL	OT	O%	CW	CL	CT	C%	PW	PL	CCs	Awards
0	Unknown	1895, 1901–1902	6	3	3	0	.500	—	—	—	—	—	—	—	—
1	J. J. Thiel	1903–1904	13	9	3	1	.731	—	—	—	—	—	—	—	—
2	Harry Huston	1905	7	3	4	0	.429	—	—	—	—	—	—	—	—
3	Jay Mack Love	1906–1907	17	8	6	2	.563	—	—	—	—	—	—	—	—
4	Frank Armin	1908	7	3	4	0	.429	—	—	—	—	—	—	—	—
5	Fred Clapp	1909–1913	42	24	12	6	.643	—	—	—	—	—	—	—	—
6	Willis Bates	1914–1925	102	52	41	9	.554	—	—	—	—	—	—	—	—
7	William Monypenny	1926–1936	95	33	53	9	.395	—	—	—	—	—	—	—	—
8	Don Copper	1937–1939	27	5	21	1	.204	—	—	—	—	—	—	—	—
9	Richard C. Nolan	1940–1941	20	10	8	2	.550	—	—	—	—	—	—	—	—
10	Henry Brock	1942	9	4	3	2	.556	—	—	—	—	—	—	—	—
X	No team	1943–1945	—	—	—	—	—	—	—	—	—	—	—	—	—
11	Art Kahler	1946–1947	19	14	4	1	.763	—	—	—	—	—	—	—	—
12	Fred Dittman	1948	10	7	3	0	.700	—	—	—	—	—	—	—	—
13	Harold Hunt	1949–1951	27	6	18	3	.278	—	—	—	—	—	—	—	—
14	Bill Carroll	1952–1953	18	2	15	1	.139	—	—	—	—	—	—	—	—
15	Robert Hower	1954–1958	46	11	31	4	.283	—	—	—	—	—	—	—	—
16	Bob Dvorak	1959–1961	27	19	6	2	.741	—	—	—	—	—	—	—	—
17	Ray Morrison	1962–1963	20	11	9	0	.550	—	—	—	—	—	—	—	—
18	Harold Elliott	1964–1968	47	37	7	3	.819	—	—	—	—	—	—	—	—
19	Wes Buller	1969–1971	27	15	11	1	.574	—	—	—	—	—	—	—	—
20	Jim Paramore	1972–1976	45	19	26	0	.422	—	—	—	—	—	—	—	—
21	Phil Hower	1977–1980	36	22	14	0	.611	—	—	—	—	—	—	—	—
22	Dennis Franchione	1981–1982	20	14	4	2	.750	—	—	—	—	—	—	—	—
23	Charlie Cowdrey	1983–1991	94	64	29	1	.686	—	—	—	—	—	—	—	—
24	Jake Cabell	1992	9	5	4	0	.556	—	—	—	—	—	—	—	—
25	Monty Lewis	1993–2001	92	59	33	0	.641	—	—	—	—	—	—	—	—
26	Chris Douglas	2002–2006	49	20	29	0	.408	—	—	—	—	—	—	—	—
27	Ken Crandall	2007–2014	74	21	53	0	.284	19	44	—	.302	—	—	—	—
28	Brad Griffin	2015–present	120	73	47	0	.608	52	37	—	.584	—	—	—	—

== Details ==
The following are details on coaches that do not have articles on Wikipedia. For coaches with articles on Wikipedia, see links in the table above.

=== John Jacob Thiel ===
Although Southwestern competed in football as far back as 1895, John Jacob Thiel was the first official head football coach at Southwestern, and he held that position for two seasons, from 1903 until 1904. His coaching record at Southwestern was 9–5–1.

After his work at the collegiate level as a professor and coach, he moved to Ritzville, Washington near his family and took up farming. He died in Spokane at the age of 69.

=== Frank Armin ===
Frank Armin was the fourth coach for the Moundbuilders and held that position for the 1908 season. Armin was also the basketball coach at Southwestern for the 1908–1909 season. He was the first basketball coach on record for the school, and the team produced six wins and three losses.

=== Fred Dittman ===
The 12th head coach was Fred Dittman, who also served in World War II with General Patton's Army and rose to the rank of captain. In 1946, Dittmann was assistant football coach to Art Kahler at Southwestern and then served as head football coach for the 1948 season while he pursued a master's degree in chemistry from the University of Kansas.

=== Robert Hower ===
Hower was the 15th coach for Southwestern and held the position from 1954 to 1958.

Hower also coached men's basketball at Southwestern and was the 13th person on record to hold that post. He coached for thirteen seasons, from 1955 until 1967 and then again for the 1970–71 season. His record was 32–37 and the team secured two Kansas Collegiate Athletic Conference championships, in 1961 and again in 1963.

Hower served as the athletic director at Southwestern until his sudden death from complications from an automobile accident in 1972. His son, Phil Hower, coached the Moundbuilders from 1977 until the conclusion of the 1980 season.

=== Phil Hower ===
Hower was the 21st football coach for program and he held that position four seasons, from 1977 to 1980. He was mentor to future Minnesota coach Jerry Kill and son of former Moundbulder athletic director and coach Robert Hower.

Hower's love and passion to play the game of football continued after he graduated and was coaching high school football. He remained active and an avid supporter of the program, playing in an alumni game and receiving a shoulder injury.

Hower continually worked in coaching, including working as the linebackers coach at Friends University in Wichita, Kansas under head coach Monty Lewis. Hower died in Winfield on April 19, 2014 at the age of 72.

== See also ==
- List of people from Cowley County, Kansas
