= List of people from Cowley County, Kansas =

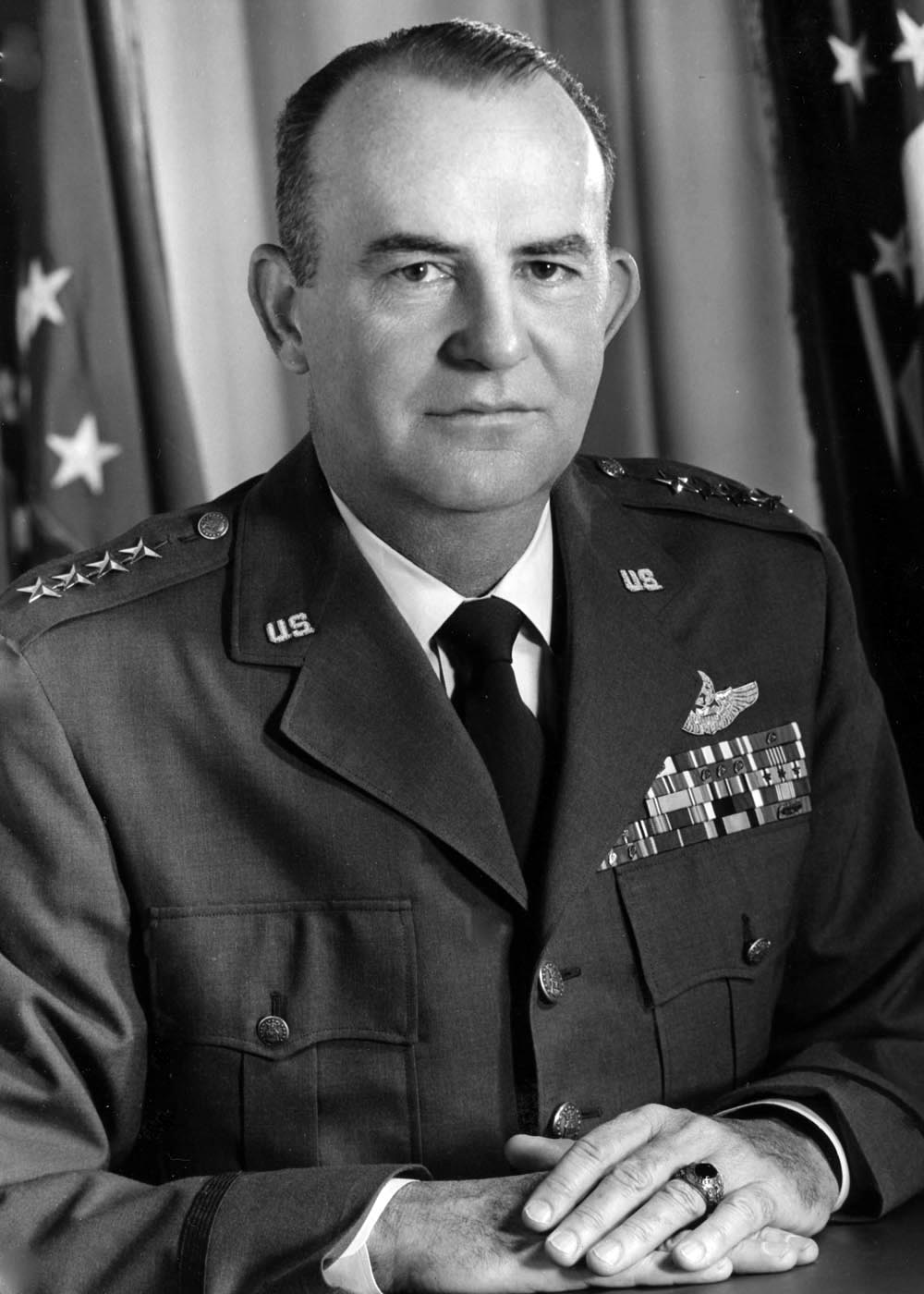
General Dean Strother was born in Winfield, attended Southwestern College, and is the namesake of Strother Field.

The following is a list of people from Cowley County, Kansas. Inclusion on the list should be reserved for notable people past and present who have resided in the county, either in cities or rural areas.

== The arts ==
- Darren E. Burrows, actor
- Terry C. Johnston, author
- Brad Long, actor who played "Buddy" #5 in the film Hoosiers
- Nila Mack, former Director of Children's Programs for CBS
- Billy Mize, musician
- Susie Owens, Playboy Playmate
- Eugene Pallette, silent film actor
- Jim "Motorhead" Sherwood, musician
- Sara Sothern, stage actress
- Gordon Young, composer

== Athletics ==
See also List of Southwestern Moundbuilders head football coaches

- Ferrell Anderson, Major League Baseball catcher
- Vic Baltzell, linebacker for the Boston Redskins in 1935
- Bob Brannum, professional basketball player
- Charles E. Burr, jockey
- Harold Corbin, 1932 Summer Olympics fencer
- Darren Daulton, Major League Baseball catcher
- Ira Davenport, US Olympic Athlete, 1912
- Dennis Franchione, college football coach
- Jim Helmer, elected to the NAIA Coaches Hall of Fame in 2001
- Lionel Hollins, NBA basketball coach
- Art Kahler, only person to coach at two different major colleges at the same time: head basketball coach at Brown University and football coach at Dickinson College in Carlisle, Pennsylvania
- Jerry Kill, current head football coach for University of Minnesota
- Mike Kirkland, women's track coach; undefeated at the conference level since named head coach in 1992
- Dick Metz, professional golfer
- Les Miller, American football player
- Jack Mitchell, college football coach
- Bennie Owen, college football coach
- Clare Patterson, Major League Baseball outfielder
- Steve Sidwell, American football player

== Celebrity ==
- Francis Lenn Taylor, father of Elizabeth Taylor

== Military ==
- General Dean C. Strother, Commander in Chief, Continental Air Defense Command

== Politics ==
- Tom Bolack, 20th Governor of New Mexico
- Robert Docking, 38th Governor of Kansas
- Greta Goodwin, Kansas politician
- Delano Lewis, former US Ambassador to South Africa
- George Thomas McDermott, US federal judge
- Betty Roberts, Associate Justice of the Oregon Supreme Court

== Religion ==
- Bruce P. Blake, Bishop of the United Methodist Church

== Science ==
- Robert A. Alberty, biophysical chemist

== Fictional ==
- Mary Ann Summers, traveler on a "three-hour tour" who was lost at sea on Gilligan's Island

== See also ==
- Lists of people from Kansas
