= List of Kansas Collegiate Athletic Conference people =

The following is a list of notable people associated with the Kansas Collegiate Athletic Conference.

== Basketball ==
=== Men's basketball ===
- Gene Johnson, assistant coach for USA Basketball in the 1936 Olympic Games
- Art Kahler, only person to coach at two different major colleges at the same time – head basketball coach at Brown University and football coach at Dickinson College in Carlisle, Pennsylvania.
- Brad Long, actor who portrayed team captain "Buddy Walker" in the 1986 film Hoosiers
- Arthur Schabinger, enshrined in the Basketball Hall of Fame as a contributor in 1961.

== Football ==
- Willis Bates, former KCAC football coach who also coached the Auburn Tigers
- Vic Baltzell, linebacker for the Boston Redskins in 1935
- Harold Elliott, head coach with over 200 career wins
- Dennis Franchione, former head coach of Alabama and Texas A&M
- Mike Gardner, current coach at Tabor, achieved post-season play in each of his first five years as a head coach
- Clarence Gilyard, actor
- Homer Woodson Hargiss, inventor of the huddle
- Lem Harkey, San Francisco 49ers
- Harold S. Herd, (also track & field) Kansas Supreme Court Justice
- Ed Hiemstra, offensive lineman for the New York Giants
- Ted Kessinger 2010 inductee in College Football Hall of Fame
- Jerry Kill, former head coach for the University of Minnesota
- Rolland Lawrence, cornerback for the Atlanta Falcons from 1973 to 1980.
- Jay Mack Love member of the National Champion 1904 Michigan Wolverines football team
- Alexander Brown Mackie, founder of Brown Mackie College
- Michael P. McCarthy, youngest General Manager ever to win a Canadian Football League championship with the Toronto Argonauts
- John H. Outland, namesake of the Outland Trophy awarded annually to the best college interior lineman
- Ernie Quigley, umpire of six World Series
- Bill Schnebel, named the 1960 "Little All-American Coach of the Year" and NAIA coach of the year.

== Track and field ==
=== Men's track and field ===
- Jim Helmer, elected to the NAIA Coach's Hall of Fame in 2001.

=== Women's track and field ===
- Mike Kirkland, Women's coach. Undefeated at the conference level since named head coach in 1992.

== Other ==
- John Salavantis, broadcaster and former coach at Ottawa University

== See also ==
- Kansas Sports Hall of Fame
- Lists of people from Kansas
