= 1904 Southwestern Methodists football team =

American college football season

1904 Southwestern Methodists football
- Conference: Kansas College Athletic Conference
- Record: 5–4–1 ( KCAC)
- Head coach: J. J. Thiel (2nd season)
- Captain: Harry Huston

The 1904 Southwestern Methodists football team represented Southwestern College during the 1904 college football season. In their second season and finals season under head coach J. J. Thiel, the Methodists compiled a record of 5–4–1.

== Schedule ==
Date	Opponent	Site	Result	Attendance	Source
September 26	Winfield High School		T 0–0		
October 1	Sumner County High School (KS)	Winfield, KS	W 6–0		
October 10	Sumner County High School (KS)	Wellington, KS	L 0–12		
October 15	at Lamont	Lamont, Oklahoma Territory	L 0–5		
October 17	Tonkawa	Tonkawa, Oklahoma Territory	L 0–5		
October 31	at Friends	Wichita, KS	L 0–11		
November 5	Lamont	Winfield, KS	W 22–0		
November 12	Friends	Winfield, KS	W 9–0		
November 19	at Sumner County High School (KS)	Wellington, KS	W 17–5		
November 24	at Alva Normal	Alva, Oklahoma Territory	W 24–17	500	
