= Monty Lewis =

American football player and coach (born 1963)

Current position
- Title: Head coach
- Team: Winfield HS (KS)

Biographical details
- Born: January 2, 1963 (age 63); Greeley, Colorado, U.S.

Playing career
- 1981–1984: Southwestern (KS)

Coaching career (HC unless noted)
- 1985: Southwestern (KS) (OL)
- 1986: Fort Hays (LB)
- 1987: Northeastern State (LB/WR)
- 1988–1989: MacMurray (OC)
- 1991: Colorado State (LB)
- 1992: Kentucky (LB/OL)
- 1993–2001: Southwestern (KS)
- 2002: West Texas A&M (OC)
- 2003–2016: Friends
- 2017: Maize South HS (KS) (QB)
- 2019–2020: Holdenville HS (OK)
- 2021–present: Winfield HS (KS)

Head coaching record
- Overall: 159–88 (college)
- Bowls: 1–0
- Tournaments: 1–6 (NAIA playoffs)

Accomplishments and honors

Championships
- 6 KCAC (1997–1999, 2006–2008)

Awards
- 5× KCAC Coach of the Year (1998–1999, 2006–2008)

Monty Lewis (born January 2, 1963) is an American football coach. He is the head football coach at Winfield High School in Winfield, Kansas. Lewis served as the head football coach at Southwestern College in Winfield, Kansas from 1993 to 2001 and Friends University in Wichita, Kansas from 2003 to 2016.

== Playing career ==
Lewis played college football at Southwestern College, where he was an National Association of Intercollegiate Athletics (NA) All-American in 1983 and 1984. He played for head coaches Dennis Franchione and Charlie Cowdrey and participated in Southwestern's the 1982 Sunflower Bowl victory.

== Coaching career ==
Lewis was the head football coach at the Southwestern College and led the team to a record of 60–32 during his tenure, including a 1996 Wheat Bowl victory against Baker, to become the all-time winningest coach in school history. After the 1997 regular season, his team played in the NAIA Football National Championship playoffs, losing 53–28 to Doane. In 1998, his Southwestern team advanced to the second round of the NAIA playoffs, defeating the Lindenwood, 12–10, in the first round and losing 52–6 to Huron. In the 1999 NAIA playoffs, the team lost in the first round to Northwestern Oklahoma State by a score of 44–10.

In 2008, Lewis won his 100th game as a head coach at the college level. Lewis was abruptly fired from Friends in March 2017. For the 2017 season, he took a job coaching quarterbacks at Maize South High School, remaining in Wichita while his son played his senior season at Friends.

== Head coaching record ==
=== College ===
Year	Team	Overall	Conference	Standing	Bowl/playoffs	NAIA^{#}
Southwestern Moundbuilders (Kansas Collegiate Athletic Conference) (1993–2001)
1993	Southwestern	4–5	4–4	T–4th		
1994	Southwestern	6–4	5–3	T–4th		
1995	Southwestern	6–4	5–3	T–3rd		
1996	Southwestern	7–3	6–2	3rd	W Wheat	
1997	Southwestern	8–3	7–1	T–1st	L NAIA First Round	
1998	Southwestern	9–2	7–1	1st	L NAIA Quarterfinal	
1999	Southwestern	8–3	7–1	T–1st	L NAIA First Round	17
2000	Southwestern	6–4	6–3	T–3rd		
2001	Southwestern	6–4	6–3	T–3rd		
Southwestern:		60–32	53–21			
Friends Falcons (Kansas Collegiate Athletic Conference) (2002–2016)
2002	Friends	5–4	5–4	T–3rd		
2003	Friends	3–6	3–6	T–8th		
2004	Friends	5–4	5–4	T–2nd		
2005	Friends	7–3	6–3	3rd		
2006	Friends	10–1	8–1	T–1st	L NAIA First Round	13
2007	Friends	9–2	8–1	T–1st	L NAIA First Round	12
2008	Friends	10–1	9–0	1st	L NAIA First Round	10
2009	Friends	8–2	7–2	3rd		15
2010	Friends	6–4	5–4	5th		
2011	Friends	5–5	5–4	T–4th		
2012	Friends	6–5	5–4	5th		
2013	Friends	8–3	7–2	T–2nd		19
2014	Friends	8–3	7–2	T–2nd		21
2015	Friends	3–8	3–6	T–5th		
2016	Friends	6–5	5–4	5th		
Friends:		99–56	88–47			
Total:		159–88				
National championship Conference title Conference division title or championship game berth
