= 1906 Southwestern Methodists football team =

American college football season

1906 Southwestern Methodists football
- Conference: Kansas College Athletic Conference
- Record: 3–6 ( KCAC)
- Head coach: Jay Mack Love (1st season)
- Captain: Lloyd H. Brannon

The 1906 Southwestern Methodists football team represented Southwestern College during the 1906 college football season. In their first season under head coach Jay Mack Love, the Methodists compiled a record of 3–6.

== Schedule ==
Date	Time	Opponent	Site	Result	Source
September 29		Friends	Winfield, KS	L 0–10	
October 6		Sumner County High School (KS)	Southwestern Athletic Park; Winfield, KS	W 23–0	
October 13		vs. Chilocco	Arkansas City, KS	L 0–17	
October 20	3:00 p.m.	at Friends	Hess Field; Wichita, KS	L 6–10	
October 27	3:45 p.m.	at Alva Normal	Arena; Alva, OK	W 10–6	
October 31		at Helena High School (OK)	Helena, OK	W 17–0	
November 12	2:30 p.m.	at Fairmount	Fairmount Athletic Field; Wichita, KS	L 6–18	
November 29	2:30 p.m.	College of Emporia	Southwestern Athletic Park; Winfield, KS	L 0–6	

== Roster ==
Everard Hinsilaw (center), Gun Muchmore (guard), Elbert Morgan (guard), Clyde Muchmore (guard), Fred H. Clapp (tackle), Alva Snvder (tackle), Ira Beach (tackle), Bennie Wooddell (end), Joe Hamilton (End), Ray Nichols (halfback), Arthur Crow (halfback), Depew Head (quarterback), Lloyd H. Brannon (full back), Harold Elbright (sub), Earl Wallace (sub), Ray Ligget (sub), Ira Berxstore (sub)
