= Charlie Cowdrey =

American football coach

Biographical details
- Born: November 16, 1933; Camden Point, Missouri, U.S.
- Died: January 18, 2011 (aged 77); Winfield, Kansas, U.S.

Coaching career (HC unless noted)
- 1957–1965: Smithville HS (MO)
- 1966–1968: Fort Scott
- 1969–1976: Missouri (assistant)
- 1977–1980: Illinois State
- 1981: Great Bend HS (KS)
- 1982: Drake (offensive backfield)
- 1983–1991: Southwestern (KS)
- 1993–1995: Morningside

Head coaching record
- Overall: 81–86–4 (college); 22–6–3 (junior college)
- Bowls: 0–1 (junior college)

Accomplishments and honors

Championships
- 1 KJCCC (1968)

Charles E. Cowdrey (November 16, 1933 – January 18, 2011) was an American football coach. Cowdrey served as a head high school coach for nine years, head coach at Fort Scott Community College for three years, assistant coach at University of Missouri for eight years, head coach at Illinois State University for four years, assistant coach at Drake University for one year, and head coach at Southwestern College for nine years. His overall record as a head coach including high school coaching is 138 wins, 85 losses, 6 ties, and as a college head coach he achieved a record of 81 wins, 86 losses, and 4 ties.

== Early life ==
Cowdrey was born in Camden Point, Missouri, received a bachelor's degree in physical education from Northwest Missouri State University and a master's degree from the University of Missouri.

Cowdrey began his career as a coach at Smithville High School from 1957 to 1966. He then at Fort Scott Community College from 1966 to 1969 and then was an assistant coach the University of Missouri from 1969 to 1977.

== Coaching career ==
=== Illinois State ===
Cowdrey was the 16th head football coach for the Illinois State Redbirds in Normal, Illinois, and he held that position for four seasons, from 1977 until 1980. His overall coaching record at ISU was 12 wins, 31 losses, and 1 tie. This ranks him 11th at ISU in terms of total wins and 17th at ISU in terms of winning percentage.

Charlie Cowdrey became perhaps the only football coach in NCAA history to be fired less than 24 hours after his team had scored a major upset.

=== Southwestern College ===
From 1983 to 1991, he was the 23rd head coach for the Southwestern College Moundbuilders in Winfield, Kansas, where he compiled a record of 59 wins and 34 losses with 1 tie, taking over the program from famed football coach Dennis Franchione. He held the position for nine season and became the 7th most successful coach at Southwestern College in terms of winning percentage (65.2%) and second in terms of total number of wins with 59.

Cowdrey took his teams to two separate bowl games, coaching half of the post-season bowls in school history. Both appearances were in the Sunflower Bowl, and the team lost both times. But 1984 was the first year that Southwestern qualified for the NAIA Football National Championship. The first round the team defeated conference rival Bethel 17–14, and then lost to Northwestern College by a score of 45-23.

About being fired from the post, his son Bruce Cowdrey (also a football coach) related this story:

"A long time ago, my dad, Charlie Cowdrey (former Illinois State coach) was coaching Southwestern College in Winfield, Kan., when I asked him how he felt about being fired, ... he said, ‘When I came here, the first school president loved me. The second one didn't like football. The third one, he fired the chaplain. So I knew I was next.'"

=== Morningside College ===
After Southwestern, Cowdrey became the head coach at Morningside College in Sioux City, Iowa from 1993 through the 1995 season. His teams at Morningside produce 5 wins, 26 losses, and 2 ties during his three years as head coach.

== Death ==
Cowdrey died on January 18, 2011, at his home in Winfield.

== Head coaching record ==
=== College ===
Year	Team	Overall	Conference	Standing	Bowl/playoffs
Illinois State Redbirds (NCAA Division I/I-A independent) (1977–1980)
1977	Illinois State	3–7–1			
1978	Illinois State	2–9			
1979	Illinois State	3–8			
1980	Illinois State	4–7			
Illinois State:		12–31–1			
Southwestern Moundbuilders (Kansas Collegiate Athletic Conference) (1983–1991)
1983	Southwestern	8–2–1	8–0–1	1st	L Sunflower
1984	Southwestern	9–3	8–1	2nd	L NAIA Division II Seminfinal
1985	Southwestern	8–3	8–1	1st	L Sunflower
1986	Southwestern	7–3	7–2	T–2nd	
1987	Southwestern	8–2	8–1	T–1st	
1988	Southwestern	6–4	6–3	T–2nd	
1989	Southwestern	7–3	7–2	3rd	
1990	Southwestern	6–4	6–3	4th	
1991	Southwestern	5–5	5–4	T–4th	
Southwestern:		64–29–1	63–17–1		
Morningside Chiefs (North Central Conference) (1993–1995)
1993	Morningside	2–9	1–8	T–9th	
1994	Morningside	3–8	2–7	9th	
1995	Morningside	0–9–2	0–8–1	10th	
Morningside:		5–26–2	3–23–1		
Total:		81–86–1			
National championship Conference title Conference division title or championship game berth

=== Junior college ===
Year	Team	Overall	Conference	Standing	Bowl/playoffs
Fort Scott Greyhounds (Kansas Jayhawk Junior College Conference) (1966–1968)
1966	Fort Scott	5–3–2	5–1–2	2nd	
1967	Fort Scott	7–2–1	6–2	T–2nd	
1968	Fort Scott	10–1	8–0	1st	L Sterling Silver Bowl
Fort Scott:		22–6–3	19–3–2		
Total:		22–6–3			
National championship Conference title Conference division title or championship game berth
