= 1912 Southwestern Moundbuilders football team =

American college football season

1912 Southwestern Moundbuilders football
- Conference: Kansas Collegiate Athletic Conference
- Record: 6–2 (4–2 KCAC)
- Head coach: Fred Clapp (4th season)

The 1912 Southwestern Moundbuilders football team represented Southwestern College in the 1912 college football season. On November 8, 1912, Southwestern defeated Fairmont College (now Wichita State University) by a score of 41 to 3. This was the first of a series of wins where Southwestern would beat or tie Fairmont ten of eleven games. This period of time earned the school the name "The Jinx" for many years to come.
