= Ray Morrison (coach) =

American football and baseball coach

Playing career

Football
- 1946–1949: Wichita

Baseball
- c. 1949: Wichita
- Positions: Fullback, halfback (football)

Coaching career (HC unless noted)

Football
- 1955–1956: Friends
- 1957–1959: Wichita (freshmen)
- 1960–1961: Pratt HS (KS)
- 1962–1963: Southwestern (KS)

Baseball
- 1957–1960: Wichita

Head coaching record
- Overall: 13–23–1 (college football); 54–44 (college baseball)

Ray "Scooter" Morrison was an American football and baseball coach. He served as the head football coach at Friends University in Wichita, Kansas from 1955 to 1956 and at Southwestern College in Winfield, Kansas from 1962 to 1963. Morrison was also head baseball coach at the Municipal University of Wichita—now known as Wichita State University—from 1957 to 1960, tallying a mark of 54–44. He coached football at Pratt High School in Kansas before moving to Southwestern.

== Head coaching record ==
=== Collège football ===
Year	Team	Overall	Conference	Standing	Bowl/playoffs
Friends Quakers (NAIA independent) (1955–1956)
1955	Friends	0–8			
1956	Friends	2–6–1			
Friends:		2–14–1			
Southwestern Moundbuilders (Kansas Collegiate Athletic Conference) (1962–1963)
1962	Southwestern	5–5	5–4	4th	
1963	Southwestern	6–4	5–4	T–4th	
Southwestern:		11–9	10–8		
Total:		13–23–1			
