= Fred Clapp =

American football and basketball coach

Biographical details
- Born: February 17, 1885; Kinsley, Kansas, U.S.
- Died: October 14, 1967 (aged 82); Upland, California, U.S.

Playing career

Football
- 1907–1908: Southwestern (KS)
- Position: Tackle

Coaching career (HC unless noted)

Football
- 1909–1913: Southwestern (KS)
- 1926–1927: Chaffey

Basketball
- 1909–1914: Southwestern (KS)

Administrative career (AD unless noted)
- 1909–1914: Southwestern (KS)

Head coaching record
- Overall: 24–11–6 (college football); 39–24 (college basketball)

Accomplishments and honors

Championships
- Football; 1 KCAC (1913)

Fred Henry Clapp (February 17, 1885 – October 14, 1967) was an American college football and college basketball coach and educator. He was the fifth head football coach at the Southwestern College in Winfield, Kansas, serving for five years, from 1909 to 1913, and compiling a record of 24–11–6. Clapp was also the also the head basketball coach at Southwestern and was the second person on record to hold that post. He coached the basketball team for five seasons, from 1909 to 1914, tallying a mark of 39–24.

Clapp attended Southwestern College, where played football and competed on the track team. In 1909, he was hired as physical director and football coach at his Alma mater. Clapp also coached track at Southwestern. He left the school in 1914 to take one-year leave of absence.

Clapp earned a master's degree in physical education from the University of Southern California (USC). He taught physical education of Chaffey High School in Ontario, California for 41 years. In December 1917, Clapp married Verna M. Evans, in San Diego. He died on October 14, 1967, at San Antonio Community Hospital in Upland, California.

== Head coaching record ==
=== College football ===
Year	Team	Overall	Conference	Standing	Bowl/playoffs
Southwestern Methodists / Moundbuilders (Kansas Collegiate Athletic Conference) (1909–1913)
1909	Southwestern	2–2–3			
1910	Southwestern	5–4–1			
1911	Southwestern	5–3–1			
1912	Southwestern	6–2	4–2		
1913	Southwestern	6–1–1	4–1–1	T–1st	
Southwestern:		24–12–6			
Total:		24–12–6			
National championship Conference title Conference division title or championship game berth
