= William Carroll =

William, Will, Bill, or Billy Carroll may refer to:

== Arts and entertainment ==
- William A. Carroll (1876–1928), American silent film actor
- Bill Carroll (broadcaster) (born 1959), Canadian radio broadcast personality
- Bill Carroll (musician) (born 1966), American singer, songwriter, record producer, bassist and guitarist

== Law and politics ==
- William Carroll (Tennessee politician) (1788–1844), American politician, Governor of Tennessee
- William Carroll (Australian politician) (1872–1936), Australian Senator
- William F. Carroll (1877–1964), Canadian lawyer, judge, and politician in Nova Scotia
- William D. Carroll (1880–1955), American politician in Wisconsin
- William G. Carroll (1893–1969), American politician in New York
- William T. Carroll (1902–1992), American politician, Lieutenant Governor of Connecticut
- John William Carroll (1901–1993, American politician in Illinois

== Sports ==
- Bill Carroll (coach) (died 2009), American pole vaulter and athletics coach
- Bill Carroll (rower) (fl. 1950), New Zealand rower
- Billy Carroll (born 1959), Canadian ice hockey player
- Will Carroll (born 1970), American sportswriter

== Others ==
- William Henry Carroll (1810–1868), American Civil War Confederate general
- William K. Carroll (born 1952), American professor of sociology
