= Ken Gibler =

American football and track coach (1931–1990)

Biographical details
- Born: January 31, 1931
- Died: November 23, 1990 (aged 59); Marshall, Missouri, U.S.

Playing career

Football
- 1953–1956: Missouri Valley
- Position: End

Coaching career (HC unless noted)

Football
- 1957–1961: Blue Springs HS (MO)
- 1962–1967: Arizona State–Flagstaff / Northern Arizona (assistant)
- 1968–1990: Missouri Valley

Head coaching record
- Overall: 162–64–8 (college football); 27–18–4 (high school football)
- Bowls: 1–1
- Tournaments: Football; 3–3 (NAIA D-II playoffs)

Accomplishments and honors

Championships
- Football; 1 MCAU (1970); 5 HAAC (1971, 1974–1976, 1989)

Kenneth Bernard Gibler (January 31, 1931 – November 23, 1990) was an American football and track coach. He served as the head football coach at Missouri Valley College in Marshall, Missouri from 1968 to 1990, compiling a record of 162–64–8.

A native of Grain Valley, Missouri, Gibler attended Missouri Valley College, where he played college football as an end for four seasons before graduating in 1957. He was the head football coach at Blue Springs High School in Blue Springs, Missouri from 1957 to 1961, tallying a mark of 27–18–4. Gibler returned to Missouri Valley as after working as an assistant football coach at Northern Arizona University for six seasons under head coaches Max Spilsbury and Andy MacDonald.

Gibler died of cancer on November 23, 1990, in Marshall.

== Head coaching record ==
=== College football ===
Year	Team	Overall	Conference	Standing	Bowl/playoffs
Missouri Valley Vikings (Missouri College Athletic Union) (1968–1970)
1968	Missouri Valley	3–4–3	1–2–1	5th	
1969	Missouri Valley	5–5	2–2	4th	
1970	Missouri Valley	8–2	4–0	1st	
Missouri Valley Vikings (Heart of America Athletic Conference) (1971–1990)
1971	Missouri Valley	7–3	6–1	1st	L Mineral Water
1972	Missouri Valley	8–2	5–2	T–2nd	
1973	Missouri Valley	9–1	6–1	2nd	
1974	Missouri Valley	10–1–1	5–0–1	1st	L NAIA Division II Championship
1975	Missouri Valley	8–2	5–1	T–1st	
1976	Missouri Valley	8–1–1	5–0–1	1st	
1977	Missouri Valley	8–2	6–0	1st	
1978	Missouri Valley	9–2	6–0	1st	L NAIA Division II Semifinal
1979	Missouri Valley	7–2–1	4–2	3rd	
1980	Missouri Valley	7–4	5–3	T–3rd	
1981	Missouri Valley	8–2	7–1	2nd	
1982	Missouri Valley	6–3	5–2	T–2nd	
1983	Missouri Valley	7–2–1	5–1–1	T–2nd	W Sunflower
1984	Missouri Valley	6–4	5–2	T–2nd	
1985	Missouri Valley	4–5	3–4	T–4th	
1986	Missouri Valley	4–6	4–3	T–2nd	
1987	Missouri Valley	6–3–1	4–1–1	2nd	
1988	Missouri Valley	6–4 (Note: Missouri Valley finished the 1988 season with an overall record of 5–5 and a conference mark of 4–3, tying for third place. In March 1989, Evangel forfeited all 11 wins and their conference title because they had used two ineligible players.)	5–2	T–2nd	
1989	Missouri Valley	10–2	7–0	1st	L NAIA Division II Quarterfinal
1990	Missouri Valley	8–2	5–2	3rd	
Missouri Valley:		162–64–8	110–32–5		
Total:		162–64–8			
National championship Conference title Conference division title or championship game berth
