= Brad Griffin =

American college football coach

Current position
- Title: Head coach
- Team: Southwestern (KS)
- Conference: KCAC
- Record: 73–47

Playing career
- 1996–1997: Hutchinson
- 1999–2000: Emporia State
- Position: Running back

Coaching career (HC unless noted)
- 2001–2002: Emporia State (GA)
- 2003: Emporia State (assistant)
- 2004–2014: William Penn (DC/LB)
- 2015–present: Southwestern (KS)

Head coaching record
- Overall: 73–47
- Tournaments: 1–3 (NAIA playoffs)

Accomplishments and honors

Championships
- 2 KCAC (2021–2022); 1 KCAC Kessinger Division (2024)

Brad Griffin is an American college football coach. He is the head football coach for Southwestern College, a position he has held since 2015. Prior to his appointment, he was defensive coordinator at William Penn University in Oskaloosa, Iowa. He is the 28th head football coach in Southwestern's 111-year history of football.

Griffin graduated from Nickerson High School in Nickerson, Kansas in 1996. He started his college football career at Hutchinson Community College and continued at Emporia State University, where he was a two-year starter and team captain under Southwestern alumnus and former University of Minnesota head football coach Jerry Kill.

== Head coaching record ==
Year	Team	Overall	Conference	Standing	Bowl/playoffs	NAIA^{#}
Southwestern Moundbuilders (Kansas Collegiate Athletic Conference) (2015–present)
2015	Southwestern	3–8	3–6	T–5th		
2016	Southwestern	2–8	2–7	8th		
2017	Southwestern	5–6	5–4	4th		
2018	Southwestern	6–5	5–5	5th		
2019	Southwestern	5–6	5–5	T–5th		
2020–21	Southwestern	7–2	5–2	T–3rd		24
2021	Southwestern	9–2	9–1	T–1st	L NAIA First Round	14
2022	Southwestern	9–2	9–1	T–1st	L NAIA First Round	10
2023	Southwestern	8–3	2–3	4th (Kessinger)		
2024	Southwestern	11–2	4–1	T–1st (Kessinger)	L NAIA Second Round	13
2025	Southwestern	8–3	3–2	T–2nd (Bissell)		21
2026	Southwestern	0–0	0–0	(Bissell)		
Southwestern:		73–47	52–37			
Total:		73–47				
National championship Conference title Conference division title or championship game berth
