= KSWC =

KSWC may refer to:

- KSWC-LP, a low-power radio station (94.7 FM) licensed to serve Winfield, Kansas, United States
- KSWC (defunct), a defunct radio station (100.3 FM) formerly licensed to serve Winfield, Kansas
