= Richard C. Nolan =

American football player and coach

Biographical details
- Born: July 29, 1910; Webb City, Missouri, U.S.

Playing career
- 1930–1931: Oklahoma Military Academy
- 1932–1933: Emporia State
- Position: Guard

Coaching career (HC unless noted)
- 1935–1939: Arkansas City JC
- 1940–1941: Southwestern (KS)

Head coaching record
- Overall: 12–8–2 (college)

Richard Cleveland Nolan (July 29, 1910 – April 16, 1996) was an American football coach. He was one of the early adopters of a heavier schedule than his peer schools, playing 12 games a year. He later used football as a tool to develop physical fitness in the United States Navy.

== Playing career ==
=== High school and junior college ===
A native of Picher, Oklahoma, Nolan played guard and also served as captain of the Picher Gorillas football team in 1929. After graduating from Picher High School, Nolan was an all-state junior college football player at Oklahoma Military Academy.

=== Emporia State ===
After completing his studies at the junior college level, Nolan attended Emporia Teachers College and was named to the All-Kansas football team while playing for that school's program under head coach Fran Welch. Nolan also received a master's degree from Emporia Teachers College.

== Coaching career ==
=== Arkansas City Junior College ===
Nolan was the head football coach at Arkansas City Junior College in Arkansas City, Kansas from 1935 to 1939. While at Arkansas City Junior City College, Nolan's teams were undefeated at home for four years. The school has since disbanded its football program.

=== Southwestern College ===
In 1940, Nolan was hired by the Southwestern College Moundbuilders as the school's athletic director and head football coach. One newspaper noted that Nolan had his work cut out for him at Southwestern: "Football, however, been on the slide at Winfield since 1934 and Nolan faces a difficult problem of bringing the boys back into the money." Another Kansas newspaper in March 1940 wrote:

"Nolan knows football. Better than that, Nolan knows football players. It is reported that he drove through Frontenac, where every boy is either a potential all state guard or fullback, with an empty car. He left the town, bound for Arkansas City, with players jammed in the seats and standing on the running board."

During Nolan's first year with the Moundbuilders, interest in football grew, as one Kansas newspaper reported: "Football interest continues rampant here. The largest opening crowd in many years saw the Builders play Alva last week."

Nolan was a supporter of a heavier schedule than most schools at the time, choosing to play twelve games in the 1941 regular season when most schools would only play eight. It was not until 2005 that schools would widely pursue twelve games in a regular season.

Nolan was the ninth football coach at the Southwestern and held that position two seasons, from 1940 to 1941, compiling a record of 12–8–2.

== Military service and football ==
With the entry of the United States into World War II following the attack on Pearl Harbor, Nolan enlisted in the United States Navy. In July 1942, he was assigned along with other athletic coaches to participate in a "physical hardening program" at the Naval Air Corps' pre-flight training program at Gardner Air Base.

In 1944, Nolan was appointed the head football coach for a U.S. Navy football team known as the Norman Navy Zoomers. He coached the 1944 Norman Naval Air Station Zoomers football team to a 15–0 victory over the Oklahoma A&M Cowboys, who went on to win the 1945 Cotton Bowl Classic. He continued serving in the Navy after World War II and was the Operations Officer at the Dallas Naval Air Station as of March 1947.

== Head coaching record ==
=== College ===
Year	Team	Overall	Conference	Standing	Bowl/playoffs
Southwestern Moundbuilders (Central Intercollegiate Conference) (1940–1941)
1940	Southwestern	3–5–1	1–3	T–3rd	
1941	Southwestern	9–3–1	2–2	4th	
Southwestern:		12–8–2	3–5		
Total:		12–8–2			
