= Bill Carroll (coach) =

American pole vaulter (1926–2009)

Biographical details
- Born: May 1, 1926; Welty, Oklahoma, U.S.
- Died: December 4, 2009 (aged 83); Okemah, Oklahoma, U.S.

Coaching career (HC unless noted)

Football
- 1952–1953: Southwestern (KS)

Track and field
- 1959–1964: Oklahoma

Head coaching record
- Overall: 2–15–1 (football)

William Morris Carroll (May 1, 1926 – December 4, 2009) was an American pole vaulter and later coach of the track and field and cross country teams at the University of Oklahoma.

== Athletic career ==
Carroll was a world-ranked pole vaulter at the University of Oklahoma. He was the number 7 pole vaulter in the world in 1949, and moved up to the number six position in 1950. Those same years, he was ranked sixth and then fifth in the US. Carroll tied for second place at the 1949 NCAA Track and Field Championships with a height of 14 feet.

Carroll also enjoyed success as a high school athlete, winning the Oklahoma state high school championship in 1944. While competing in college, he set the record at the 1950 Kansas Relays with a vault of 14 feet 5 inches and set the record for the Big 7 Outdoor championship.

== Coaching career ==
=== Southwestern ===
Carroll was the 14th head football coach at the Southwestern College in Winfield, Kansas, serving for seasons, from 1952 to 1953, compiling a record of 2–15–1.

=== Oklahoma ===
Carroll was an assistant and later head coach at the University of Oklahoma for the track and field and cross country teams from 1959 until 1964.

== Head coaching record ==
=== Football ===
Year	Team	Overall	Conference	Standing	Bowl/playoffs
Southwestern Moundbuilders (Central Intercollegiate Conference) (1952–1953)
1952	Southwestern	1–7–1	0–4–1	6th	
1953	Southwestern	1–8	0–5	6th	
Southwestern:		2–15–1	0–9–1		
Total:		2–15–1			
