= Smithville School District =

School district in Missouri, U.S.

Smithville School District is a school district located north of the Kansas City Metropolitan Area in Clay County, Missouri. It currently boasts a student enrollment of about 2500 students (as of 2013 school year). The south campus consists of 3 schools, Smithville High School (9–12), Smithville Middle School (7–8), and the Smithville Upper Elementary School (Horizon) (K-6). The north campus includes only the Smithville Primary (Maple) Elementary School (K-6). The East Campus consists of Eagle Heights Elementary school (K-6), which opened in 2018.

== Notable faculty ==
- Charlie Cowdrey, high school football coach and became a college coach
