= Vic Baltzell =

American football player (1912–1986)

- Vic Baltzell, 1933

Profile
- Position: Fullback

Personal information
- Born: June 20, 1912; Soda Springs, Idaho
- Died: April 24, 1986 (age 73); Omaha, Nebraska

Career information
- College: Southwestern College (Kansas)

Career history
- Boston Redskins (1935)

Victor Leroy Baltzell Sr. (June 20, 1912 – April 24, 1986), sometimes known as both "Dick" and "Vic", and by the nickname "Bullet" Baltzell, was an American football player.

Baltzell was born in 1912 in Soda Springs, Idaho. He attended Hebron High School in Hebron, Nebraska where he played football from 1927 to 1929. He enrolled as Southwestern College in Winfield, Kansas, and played for the Southwestern Moundbuilders football team from 1931 to 1934. He was an all-conference fullback at Southwestern.

Baltzell then played four years of professional football, beginning as a fullback in the National Football League for the Boston Redskins. He appeared in two games for the Redskins during the 1935 season. He also played for the New York Yankees of the American Football League (1946) and Paterson Panthers of the American Association (1936-1938).

After his playing career, Baltzell lived in Louisville, Kentucky, where he was the executive vice president of Oakite Products Inc. He died in 1986 in Omaha, Nebraska.
