= Southwestern Moundbuilders =

Intercollegiate sports teams of Southwestern College

- University: Southwestern College
- NAIA: Region IV
- Conference: KCAC (primary)
- Athletic director: Matt O’Brien
- Location: Winfield, Kansas
- Varsity teams: 16
- Football stadium: Richard L. Jantz Stadium (4,000)
- Basketball arena: Stewart Field House (1,000)
- Baseball stadium: Broadway Sports Complex
- Softball stadium: Broadway Sports Complex
- Soccer stadium: Richard L. Jantz Stadium
- Tennis venue: T. H. Vaughan Complex
- Outdoor track and field venue: Richard L. Jantz Stadium
- Volleyball arena: Stewart Field House (1,000)
- Nickname: Moundbuilders
- Colors: Purple and white
- Mascot: Jinx
- Website: buildersports.com
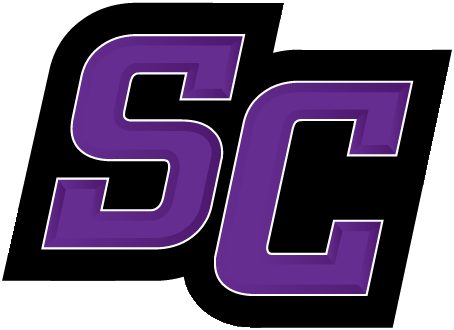

The Southwestern Moundbuilders are the athletic teams that represent Southwestern College, located in Winfield, Kansas, in intercollegiate sports as a member of the National Association of Intercollegiate Athletics (NAIA), primarily competing in the Kansas Collegiate Athletic Conference (KCAC) since the 1958–59 academic year; which they were a member on a previous stint from 1902–03 to 1922–23. The Moundbinders previously competed in the Central Intercollegiate Athletic Conference (CIC) from 1923–24 to 1957–58.

== Varsity teams ==
Southwestern competes in 16 intercollegiate varsity sports:

Men's sports	Women's sports
Baseball	Basketball
Basketball	Cross country
Cross country	Flag football
Football	Golf
Soccer	Soccer
Tennis	Softball
Track and field	Tennis
	Track and field
	Volleyball

=== Men's basketball ===
Southwestern College Men's Basketball began in 1904 with a record of 5 wins and 3 losses. Since that time, Southwestern Men's Basketball has appeared in the NAIA national tournament a total of six times with the most recent appearance in 2006 under head coach Doug Hall. The team won the national championship in 1939 and placed third in 1937.

Southwestern shows an all-time record in Men's Basketball of 1246–1019 in its first 101 seasons of play. The school currently competes in the NAIA as a Division II school at Stewart Field House (capacity: 1,000) on the Southwestern College campus

Brad Long is often called Southwestern's most famous basketball player, but not for his play on the court at Southwestern. He is best known for his role in the 1986 film Hoosiers where he played the character of team captain Buddy Walker.

=== Cross country and track & field ===
Without a doubt, Southwestern College Athletics have experienced the most success in Track & Field and Cross Country. When former head coach Jim Helmer took over the programs in 1978, the teams combined for 31 straight men's KCAC fall running championships 1980–2010. Friends University stopped the streak in 2011 under head coach Brad Peterson. while the men's track and field teams have produced 29 consecutive conference crowns 1983–2010. The women's track & field teams have followed suit with 16 consecutive KCAC Championships under Mike Kirkland. Since 1978, the Moundbuilders have been awarded seven NAIA National Champions in men's cross country and track, 81 athletes have earned NAIA All-American status a total of 188 times, and 440 separate athletes have earned All-Conference.

=== Football ===
The Southwestern College Moundbuilders football team began in 1903 with 9 wins, 5 losses, and 1 tie under coach J. J. Thiel. Since then the Builders have posted three undefeated seasons: 1913, 1918, and 1967. There has never been a season of Southwestern College Football without at least one victory. As of the 2022 season, the program has produced 57 All-Americans, 15 conference championships, 7 national playoff appearances, and 4 bowl games.

=== Golf ===
Coached by Brad Sexson and Assistant Coach Tim Jasper, the 2012–2013 Moundbuilder golf team won the KCAC conference championship, that was held at Firekeeper Golf Course, located North of Topeka, Kansas. They were led by all-conference golfers Bobby Wiedner, All- American Shane Gilbert, Justin Churchill, and Seth Bryan. They went on to compete for the National Championship that was held at Creekside Golf Club in Salem, Oregon. Current golfers for the Moudbuilder's include, Shane Gilbert, Jake Henson, Justin Churchill, Kyle Karpe, Seth Bryan, Kyle Branine, Edward Fahnestock, Jonah Powerdistrict, Stephen Venn, and Luke Arneson.

== Facilities ==
Southwestern's facilities include:

Venue	Sport(s)
Richard L. Jantz Stadium	Football; Soccer; Track and field
Broadway Sports Complex	Baseball; Softball
Stewart Field House	Basketball; Volleyball
T. H. Vaughan Complex	Tennis

== Accomplishments ==
The school boasts the following accomplishments:

- 143 KCAC Championships in 10 different sports since 1960
- 15 NAIA All-America Scholar-Athletes in 2005–06
- SC finished 77th out of nearly 300 NAIA institutions in the United States Sports Academy Directors Cup for all sports in 2006.
- Seven KCAC Championships this past year in Softball, Men's Golf, Men's and Women's Track, Men's Basketball, and Men's and Women's Cross Country.
- NAIA Region IV titles in Men's Cross Country, Men's and Women's Golf to advance to NAIA National competition.
- Men's Basketball won the KCAC Post-Season tournament and advanced to the National Tournament.
- Women's Track and Men's Track each had National Champions in 2004.
- An SC student-athlete was featured in Sports Illustrated's "Faces in the Crowd" in 2006.
- Women's Tennis and Women's Cross Country were NAIA Region IV runners-up in 2005–06.
- In excess of 170 NAIA All-America Scholar Athletes since 1981, an honor requiring a 3.5 GPA.
- Women's Basketball advanced to the "Sweet 16" of the 2004 NAIA National Tournament.
- Conference champions in football in 1997, 1998, 1999, 2021, 2022.
- Men's and Women's soccer teams advanced to the semi-finals in the 2003 KCAC Post-Season tournament.

== Conference affiliations ==
Years	Conference
1895–1923	Independent
1924–1926	Kansas Intercollegiate Athletic Conference
1927–1927	Independent
1928–1958	Central Intercollegiate Athletic Conference
1959–1959	Independent
1960–present	Kansas Collegiate Athletic Conference

table reference

== Mascot ==
=== Moundbuilders ===
Southwestern College athletic teams are known as the "Moundbuilders." Since 1927, a ceremony has been repeated every September as the student's assemble at Southwestern. Each student and faculty member, as well as clubs and organizations, place one stone. Often, the rocks are carved or painted to represent the person or organization placing the rock.

=== The Jinx ===
The mascot of Southwestern College teams is the "Jinx"—a black cat. Typically a student is dressed in the costume of a black cat for games.

The legend of "The Jinx" began in the early 1900s. Celebrating an easy victory over arch-rival Fairmount College (now Wichita State University), the students of Southwestern placed a tombstone on Southwestern's campus. The tombstone had a picture of a black cat and the final score of that season's game: 41–3. For the next 14 years the "jinxed" stone stood in defiance as the Moundbuilders won every game against Fairmount.

The players and student body of Fairmount took action. Students made several attempts to remove the stone but each time, the stone was rescued by Southwestern faculty and students.

Finally the Fairmount players sneaked down to Southwestern's campus and stole the tombstone. They then used dynamite to blow it up in a nearby field. The next game all players for Fairmont kept a piece of the stone with them for luck. When that final measure failed to work and Southwestern once again won the game, the frustrated Fairmount players threw down their pieces of the "jinxed" stone and left the field.

According to several eyewitnesses, the Southwestern students picked up the broken pieces and hid them in various places around Southwestern's campus. Legend holds that the pieces still remain hidden throughout the campus.

Some points of the legend differ in facts. The game that began the run was under coach Fred H. Clapp and was played on November 8, 1912 and it was only two years later on October 16, 1914 when head coach Willis Bates would lead the Moudbuilders in a 20–0 home loss against Fairmont. However, the two schools played after that for nine games with Southwestern winning five times and the remaining four games ending in a tie. It would not be until Halloween of 1925 when Fairmont College under the leadership of Sam H. Hill would defeat Southwestern again.

== Players and coaches in professional sports and/or collegiate coaching ==
- Vic Baltzell, linebacker for the Boston Redskins in 1935
- Jerry Kill, former head coach for University of Minnesota
- Monty Lewis, current head coach for Winfield High School
- Jay Mack Love, member of the National Champion 1904 Michigan Wolverines football team
