= Dennis Franchione =

American football coach (1951–2026))

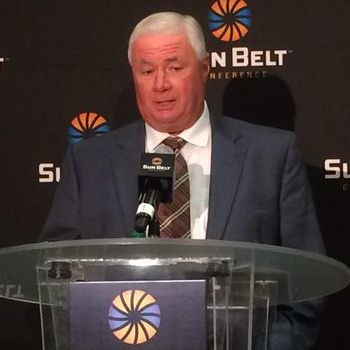
- Franchione at the 2015 Sun Belt Media day

Biographical details
- Born: March 28, 1951; Girard, Kansas, U.S.
- Died: October 6, 2026 (aged 75); Austin, Texas, U.S.
- Education: Pittsburg State University (1973)

Coaching career (HC unless noted)
- 1973–1974: Miller HS (MO)
- 1975: Mulvane HS (KS) (assistant)
- 1976–1977: Peabody-Burns HS (KS)
- 1978–1980: Kansas State (WR)
- 1981–1982: Southwestern (KS)
- 1983–1984: Tennessee Tech (OC)
- 1985–1989: Pittsburg State
- 1990–1991: Southwest Texas State
- 1992–1997: New Mexico
- 1998–2000: TCU
- 2001–2002: Alabama
- 2003–2007: Texas A&M
- 2011–2015: Texas State

Administrative career (AD unless noted)
- 1988–1989: Pittsburg State

Head coaching record
- Overall: 213–135–2
- Bowls: 4–3
- Tournaments: 5–4 (NAIA D-I playoffs); 1–1 (NCAA D-II playoffs)

Accomplishments and honors

Championships
- 1 KCAC (1982); 4 CIAC (1985–1988); 1 MIAA (1989); 2 WAC (1999–2000); 1 WAC Mountain Division (1997)

Awards
- 2× NAIA Division I Coach of the Year (1986–1987); 2× AFCA Regional Coach of the Year (1989–1990); 2× WAC Coach of the Year (1993, 1997); Kansas Sports Hall of Fame

Dennis Wayne Franchione (March 28, 1951 – October 6, 2026) was an American college football coach. He was a head coach for 27 seasons at an assortment of schools. He was at Southwestern College in Winfield, Kansas (1981–1982), Pittsburg State University (1985–1989), Southwest Texas State University (1990–1991), the University of New Mexico (1992–1997), Texas Christian University (1998–2000), the University of Alabama (2001–2002), Texas A&M University (2003–2007) and then back at Southwest Texas, by then known as Texas State University, from 2011 to 2015. In his 27 seasons as a head coach in college football, Franchione won eight conference championships and one divisional crown.

== Background ==
Franchione was born in Girard, Kansas on March 28, 1951. He received his Bachelor of Arts in 1973 from Pittsburg State University in Pittsburg, Kansas. Franchione and his wife, the former Kim Kraus, began dating after he took her on a tour of his alma mater, Pittsburg State, at the request of her father. They married shortly after, in 1977, while living in Peabody, Kansas. The couple have two daughters, Elizabeth Ann and Ashley Renee. Brad Franchione, his son from a previous marriage, was the head football coach at Blinn College prior to his most recent position with his father at Texas State. Brad and his wife, Rebecca, have three children.

Franchione died of cancer in Austin, Texas, on October 6, 2026, at the age of 75.

== Coaching career ==
=== Early career ===
After graduating from Pittsburg State, Franchione was the head football coach at Miller High School in Miller, Missouri, from 1973 to 1978. He then was an assistant coach at Mulvane High School in Mulvane, Kansas, in 1975. From 1976 to 1977, he was the head coach at Peabody-Burns High School in Peabody, Kansas, where he led the team to 2nd in 2A state playoffs. In 1978, Franchione was hired to be an assistant coach at Kansas State University, a position he held until he was hired to be the head coach at Southwestern College in Winfield, Kansas, in 1981. During his two years at Southwestern, he led the team to a 14–4–2 record, a Kansas Collegiate Athletic Conference title, and a Sunflower Bowl win. His 9 wins in 1982 tied the school record and was Southwestern's most since 1967.

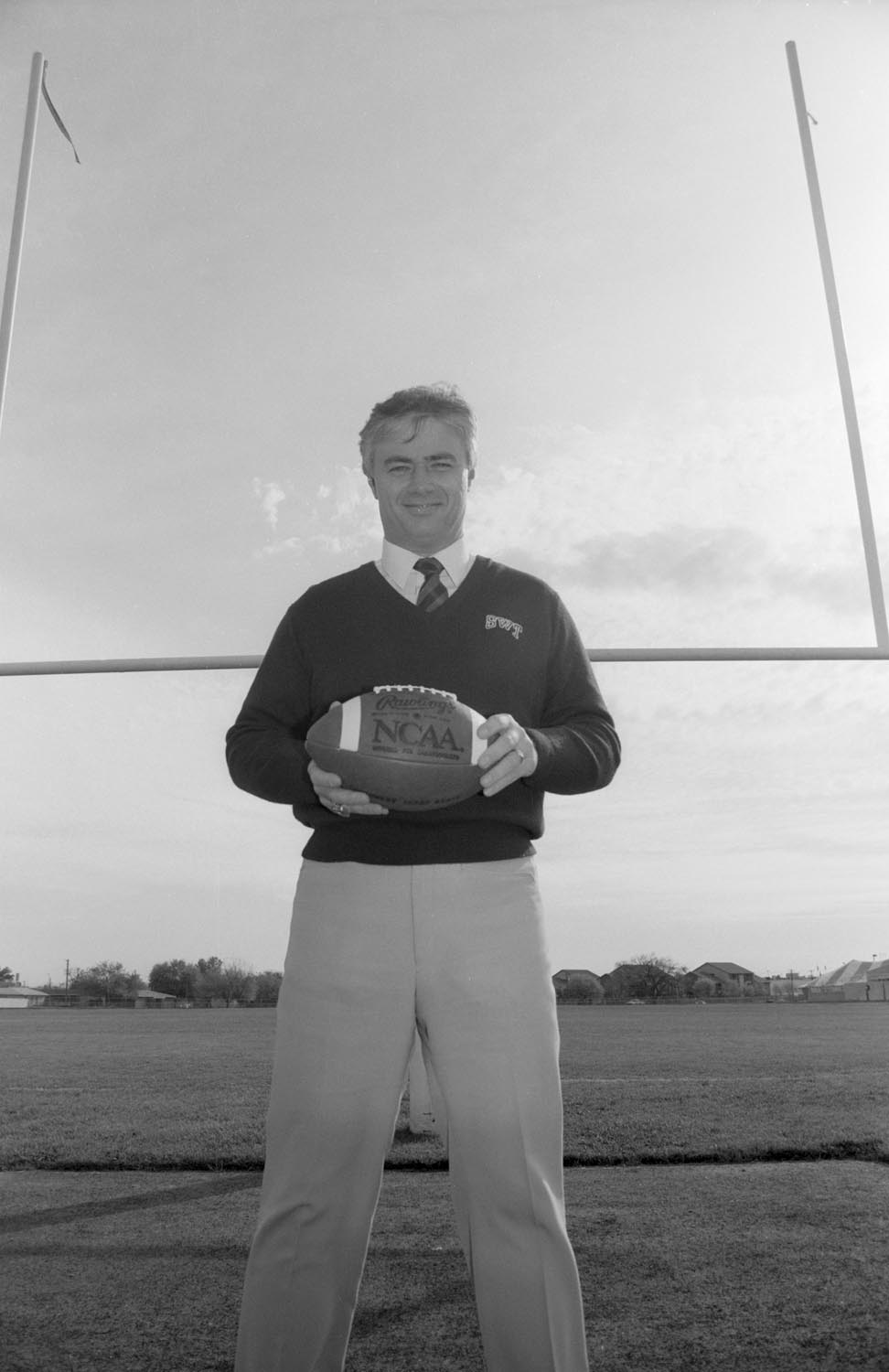
Franchione in 1989

After two seasons as offensive coordinator at Tennessee Tech in 1983 and 1984, Franchione was hired as the head coach at his alma mater, Pittsburg State University. During his five seasons with the Gorillas, he led the team to a 53–6 record, 37–1 in conference, won five conference titles, and was named NAIA National Coach of the Year twice. He tied the school record for victories in a single season three times before breaking it with the 12 victories of his 1989 team. In 1990, he joined Texas State University, where he spent two years and compiled a 13–9 record.

=== New Mexico ===
In 1992, Franchione took his first head coaching job in Division I-A at the University of New Mexico. In his six seasons at New Mexico, he led the Lobos to a 33–36 record, including a 9–4 mark in 1997, which earned the Lobos a Western Athletic Conference Mountain Division Championship and an invitation to play in the 1997 Insight.com Bowl, their first bowl berth since 1961.

=== TCU ===
In 1998, Franchione became the head coach at TCU and promptly turned their fortunes around, going from 1–10 the year before to 7–5 and a berth in the Sun Bowl, where the Horned Frogs defeated Southern California and set the record for fewest rushing yards allowed in a bowl game. He again led the Horned Frogs to a bowl game in 1999 on the legs of junior tailback LaDainian Tomlinson, who led the nation in rushing. Going into the 2000 season, the Frogs were being touted as a possible BCS Bowl contender before a disappointing loss to San Jose State. Despite the loss, the Frogs finished the season 10–1, were co-champions of the Western Athletic Conference, and accepted a bid to the 2000 Mobile Alabama Bowl. Before the scheduled bowl game, Franchione accepted a head-coaching offer by the University of Alabama. Franchione was voted by TCU players to lead the team in the bowl game, which Franchione's defensive coordinator and newly named head coach Gary Patterson supported; however, after some controversy at the Heisman Trophy ceremony, TCU Athletic Director Eric Hyman reversed the vote, preventing Franchione from coaching the bowl game.

During Franchione's three years at TCU, he led the Horned Frogs to their first bowl victory since 1957, their first top-25 finish since 1959, and held the highest winning percentage among TCU coaches since Francis Schmidt (1929–1933).

=== Alabama ===
Franchione became the head coach at the University of Alabama in 2001 and led the team, which had posted a 3–8 record the prior season, to a 7–5 record in 2001 and a 10–3 record in 2002. The 2001 team won the Independence Bowl, Alabama's first bowl win in five seasons. The 2002 team finished with a 6–2 conference record, placing first in the West Division of the Southeastern Conference. However, due to NCAA sanctions resulting from violations of the previous Alabama head coach, Mike DuBose, the 2002 team was ineligible for postseason games, including the SEC Championship Game.

Alabama officials offered Franchione a 10-year contract extension worth $15 million. Franchione, however, did not sign the offer. Following the dismissal of Texas A&M head coach R. C. Slocum, Franchione publicly denied before the 2002 Iron Bowl a rumor that he would replace Slocum. On December 5, 2002, Franchione flew to Texas to interview for the A&M job. His decision was influenced by the NCAA sanctions placed on Alabama, which included a two-year bowl ban, the loss of 21 scholarships over three years, and five years' probation. Franchione did not return to Alabama after being hired, instead informing players of his decision to accept the job at A&M by video teleconference.

=== Texas A&M ===
==== 2003–2006 seasons ====
Upon being hired by Texas A&M, Franchione brought the majority of his coaching staff with him to College Station for the 2003 season. Franchione signed a contract that was set to pay him a yearly salary of $1.7 million through 2010. The Aggies finished the 2003 season with a 4–8 record, including a nationally televised 77–0 loss to Oklahoma, the worst loss in A&M's history. The season also marked the first losing season for the Aggies in 21 years.

In the 2004 season, Franchione attempted the rebuilding process as the team improved to a 7–5 record, and a 5–3 record in conference play, including a 35–34 overtime loss to unranked Baylor at Waco, ending a 13-game winning streak the Aggies had with Baylor and a 32–25 overtime win over the then #25 Texas Tech at Kyle Field, snapping a three-game skid to the Red Raiders. The Aggies ended up advancing to the Cotton Bowl Classic to play #17 Tennessee, but lost 38–7. Following the bowl game, A&M officials extended Franchione's contract through 2012 and raised his salary to $2 million. In June 2005, prior to the 2005 season, Franchione donated $1 million to the A&M athletic department. The donation went toward the construction of an indoor practice facility, which was located adjacent to Kyle Field. It has since been replaced with a new facility.

In the 2005 season, Franchione's Aggies, who were ranked 17th in the preseason AP Poll, regressed to a 5–6 record. The 2005 Aggie defense ranked 107th nationally (out of 119 Division I NCAA teams) and allowed 443.8 yards per game. This prompted Franchione to dismiss defensive coordinator Carl Torbush. Franchione then hired former Western Michigan head coach Gary Darnell to replace Torbush.

In the 2006 season, the Aggies again rebounded under Franchione, posting a 9–3 regular season record that included Franchione's first win over rival Texas. The 9–3 record also marked the most wins for A&M since 1998. However, in that season's Oklahoma game, which ESPN's College GameDay visited, Franchione was criticized by fans for making a field goal call with 3:28 left in the game. The 18th-ranked Sooners ended up defeating the 21st-ranked Aggies, 17–16. In the postseason, the Aggies faced 20th-ranked California in the Holiday Bowl and lost 45–10.

==== 2007 season ====
===== Newsletter controversy =====
On September 27, 2007, Franchione discontinued selling a secret email newsletter to athletic boosters who paid $1,200 annually for team information that Franchione had refused to release to the public. The newsletter, called "VIP Connection", had been written by Franchione's personal assistant, former Kansas City Star columnist Mike McKenzie, and included specific injury reports, recruitment information, and Franchione's critical assessments of players. Started in the fall of 2004, the newsletter attracted 27 recipients, six of whom received the newsletter for free. Twenty of the recipients have been disclosed. The boosters were asked to sign a confidentiality statement to assure the information in the newsletter would not be used for gambling. Though Franchione and McKenzie denied gaining profit from the newsletter, Franchione stated that proceeds went to the company that managed his now-defunct website, coachfran.com. The newsletter was discovered by athletic director Bill Byrne after it was presented to him by a San Antonio Express-News reporter, who had received it through an unidentified A&M booster. After Byrne made clear to Franchione that he did not approve of the newsletter, Franchione discontinued it. ESPN's Pat Forde speculated that the newsletter's existence had been revealed by a recipient who felt chagrin at the Aggies' lackluster effort against Miami; the Aggies lost 34–17 after being down 31–0 going into the fourth quarter.

The last issue of the newsletter, dated September 13, 2007, revealed that Franchione earned a net profit of $37,806.32 from the newsletter. In a press conference the following Tuesday, October 2, Franchione apologized in front of A&M football players and expressed his love for the job and the university, and his desire to "elevate the program to its highest level." A&M players also expressed their support for Franchione as a coach. Shortly after, an investigation had been launched to look into the matter, conducted by Bill Byrne and A&M's NCAA compliance officer, David Batson. The investigation concluded that Franchione violated two NCAA rules and one of the Big 12's sportsmanship policies. These findings were in turn reported to the NCAA. The NCAA requires coaches to submit reports that include "athletically related income and benefits from sources outside of the institution", which is also required by Franchione's contract. Franchione also mentioned the names of recruits; NCAA rules bar coaches from talking about recruiting targets. Additionally, material in an April 2007 newsletter violated Big 12 rules. On October 11, 2007, Byrne issued a formal "letter of admonishment" to Franchione and ordered him to shut down CoachFran.com. Byrne also fired McKenzie.

The discovery of the newsletter led CBS Sportsline (now CBSSports.com) columnist Gregg Doyel to call for Franchione to be fired. Doyel wrote that Franchione could have potentially been fired for cause simply for hiding the newsletter's existence. He added that many of Franchione's columns announced firings of assistant coaches before that assistant was told himself and reported injuries that were not disclosed to the press. More seriously, Doyel said, his disclosures of injury information breached the trust of his players at best and potentially violated federal health privacy law at worst. Doyel also argued that the entire venture would have violated federal tax law if Franchione had not told the IRS about it. He also suggested that Franchione either knew or reasonably should have known that the newsletter's recipients were using the information to make better-informed bets on Aggie games.

===== Resignation =====
After the Aggies' loss at Miami in September 2007, Franchione's coaching abilities were brought into question. On November 6, 2007, ESPN, CBS Sports, the San Antonio Express-News, and Houston Chronicle all reported that Franchione would not return for the 2008 season, and that Franchione and Texas A&M were working on buyout terms. In response, Texas A&M officials told the Dallas Morning News that the reports were false rumors and that Franchione's performance was to be reviewed at the end of the season. In a press conference the following day, Franchione declined to answer questions regarding his future at A&M.

After Franchione led the Aggies to a 38–30 victory over the 13th-ranked Texas Longhorns—his second win over the Longhorns in a row—he announced his resignation in the postgame press conference. In the press conference, after he discussed the game, he read out loud a farewell letter that he had prepared beforehand. His last words were "Thank you, and gig 'em." Franchione immediately left the press conference as A&M athletic director Bill Byrne started to speak, with friends and family members following him. The following day, Byrne named defensive coordinator Gary Darnell as interim head coach. Darnell led the Aggies to a 24–17 defeat at the hands of Penn State in the Alamo Bowl on December 29. On November 26, three days after Franchione resigned, former Green Bay Packers head coach, and Houston Texans' offensive coordinator Mike Sherman was announced as the new head football coach. On December 7, the Texas A&M Board of Regents approved a reduced buyout of $4.4 million for Franchione.

==== Overall performance at Texas A&M ====
During his five-season tenure at A&M, Franchione did not produce a team that finished higher than third in the Big 12 South. Though he was able to bring recruiting classes that ranked among the top 13 nationally from 2003 to 2005, none of his teams ranked in the postseason AP or Coaches national polls. He also compiled a 4–16 record against ranked teams, and a 4–14 record against Texas, Oklahoma, Nebraska, and Texas Tech. Additionally, he compiled a 19–21 Big 12 record, and never won more than five games in Big 12 play. Forde wrote after Franchione's ouster that despite this, Franchione would have normally earned a reprieve with his second consecutive win over Texas. Forde concluded the furor over the newsletter ended any chance of him returning in 2008, regardless of record. Franchione's questionable judgement continued to dog him as he left A&M. The two questionable departures from TCU and Alabama, coupled with the newsletter scandal and Franchione's mediocre record at A&M, severely damaged his reputation. His tenure in College Station was an overall failure.

=== 2007–2010 ===
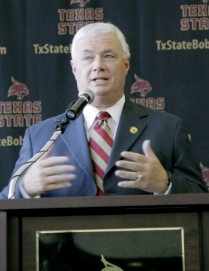
Franchione at Texas State, 2011

Franchione moved to the exurban Austin-area community of Horseshoe Bay, Texas, and was out of football for the first time in over 30 years. In January 2008, he began to look for potential broadcasting jobs. In July 2008, signed a 16-game contract to serve as a color commentator for ESPN Radio during the 2008 college football season. His debut was the Alabama vs. Clemson game on August 30.

Franchione interviewed for the San Diego State University head-coaching job in 2008 when the school fired Chuck Long, and ended up being a finalist for the job alongside then-Ball State head coach (and future Michigan head coach) Brady Hoke and UCLA defensive coordinator DeWayne Walker. The job eventually went to Hoke.

Franchione applied for the head-coaching position at UNLV, following Mike Sanford's termination as head football coach after the 2009 season. Franchione interviewed with UNLV's Athletic Director Jim Livengood on December 21, 2009, but was not selected.

=== Texas State ===
Following Brad Wright's dismissal, Texas State University engaged Parker Executive Search to help them find their next head football coach. Finalists included former Colorado head coach Dan Hawkins, Oklahoma co-defensive coordinator Bobby Jack Wright, former Minnesota head coach Tim Brewster, and Franchione. On January 7, 2011, Franchione was named head coach of Texas State's football program and signed a five-year contract valued at $350,000 per year. This was Franchione's second tenure with Texas State, having previously coached at what was then Southwest Texas State in 1990 and 1991. His second tenure at Texas State was slightly less successful with a record of 26–34 compared to 13–9 in first. Franchione led Texas State into Football Bowl Subdivision level football in 2012, joining the Western Athletic Conference. Texas State then negotiated membership in the more stable Sun Belt Conference beginning in 2013, after the WAC stopped sponsoring football.

Franchione retired from Texas State on December 22, 2015, after a 3–9 season.

== Head coaching record ==
Year	Team	Overall	Conference	Standing	Bowl/playoffs	Coaches^{#}	AP^{°}
Southwestern Moundbuilders (Kansas Collegiate Athletic Conference) (1981–1982)
1981	Southwestern	5–2–2	5–2–1	2nd			
1982	Southwestern	9–2	8–1	T–1st	W Sunflower		
Southwestern:		14–4–2	13–3–1				
Pittsburg State Gorillas (Central States Intercollegiate Conference) (1985–1988)
1985	Pittsburg State	8–2	6–1	1st	L NAIA Quarterfinal		
1986	Pittsburg State	11–1	7–0	1st	L NAIA Semifinal		
1987	Pittsburg State	11–1	7–0	1st	L NAIA Semifinal		
1988	Pittsburg State	11–1	7–0	1st	L NAIA Semifinal		
Pittsburg State Gorillas (Missouri Intercollegiate Athletic Association) (1989)
1989	Pittsburg State	12–1	10–0	1st	L NCAA Division II Quarterfinal		
Pittsburg State:		53–6	37–1				
Southwest Texas State Bobcats (Southland Conference) (1990–1991)
1990	Southwest Texas State	6–5	2–3	3rd			
1991	Southwest Texas State	7–4	4–3	4th			
New Mexico Lobos (Western Athletic Conference) (1992–1997)
1992	New Mexico	3–8	2–6	9th			
1993	New Mexico	6–5	4–4	T–6th			
1994	New Mexico	5–7	4–4	T–5th			
1995	New Mexico	4–7	2–6	T–7th			
1996	New Mexico	6–5	3–5	T–5th (Mountain)			
1997	New Mexico	9–4	6–2	1st (Mountain)	L Insight.com		
New Mexico:		33–36	21–27				
TCU Horned Frogs (Western Athletic Conference) (1998–2000)
1998	TCU	7–5	4–4	T–5th (Mountain)	W Sun		
1999	TCU	8–4	5–2	T–1st	W Mobile Alabama		
2000	TCU	10–1 (Note: Franchione left for Alabama after the regular season; Gary Patterson coached TCU in the Mobile Alabama Bowl.)	7–1	T–1st	Mobile Alabama	18	21
TCU:		25–10	16–7				
Alabama Crimson Tide (Southeastern Conference) (2001–2002)
2001	Alabama	7–5	4–4	T–3rd (Western)	W Independence		
2002	Alabama	10–3	6–2	1st (Western)	Ineligible		11
Alabama:		17–8	10–6				
Texas A&M Aggies (Big 12 Conference) (2003–2007)
2003	Texas A&M	4–8	2–6	5th (South)			
2004	Texas A&M	7–5	5–3	T–3rd (South)	L Cotton		
2005	Texas A&M	5–6	3–5	4th (South)			
2006	Texas A&M	9–4	5–3	3rd (South)	L Holiday		
2007	Texas A&M	7–5 (Note: Franchione served as Texas A&M's head coach for 2007 regular season before resigning. Darnell was appointed interim head coach the team's bowl game. Texas A&M lost the Alamo Bowl and finished the year with an overall record of 7–6.)	4–4	T–4th (South)	Alamo		
Texas A&M:		32–28	19–21				
Texas State Bobcats (NCAA Division I FBS Transitional) (2011)
2011	Texas State	6–6					
Texas State Bobcats (Western Athletic Conference) (2012)
2012	Texas State	4–8	2–4	5th			
Texas State Bobcats (Sun Belt Conference) (2013–2015)
2013	Texas State	6–6	2–5	7th			
2014	Texas State	7–5	5–3	T–4th			
2015	Texas State	3–9	2–6	10th			
Southwest Texas State / Texas State:		39–43	17–24				
Total:		213–135–2					
National championship Conference title Conference division title or championship game berth
^{#}Rankings from final Coaches Poll.; ^{°}Rankings from final AP Poll.

== See also ==
- List of college football career coaching wins leaders
- List of college football head coaches with non-consecutive tenure
