= Jim Helmer =

Biographical details
- Born: September 9, 1949 (age 77); Lyons, Kansas
- Education: Southwestern

Playing career
- 1968-1971: Southwestern
- Position: Distance Runner

Coaching career (HC unless noted)
- 1978-present: Southwestern

Accomplishments and honors

Awards
- NAIA Coach's Hall of Fame, 2001; KCAC CC Coach of the Year (26 times); KCAC M Track Coach of the Year (25 times); NAIA Dist 10 CC Coach of the Year (8 times); NAIA Dist 10 M Track Coach of the Year (11 times); NAIA Area 3 M Track Coach of the Year (4 times); NAIA Area 3 CC Coach of the Year (2 times); NAIA Grt Plns Reg CC Coach of the Year (1 time); NAIA Reg IV Coach of the Year (2 times); NAIA Reg IV M Ind Track Coach of the Year (2 times); NAIA Reg IV M Track Coach of the Year (1 time); Kansas Sports Hall of Fame 2018

Jim Helmer (born c. 1950) is the former head cross country & men's track coach at Southwestern College in Winfield, Kansas. He has held the position from 1978 until his retirement in 2017 where he has achieved consistent success. Helmer was elected to the NAIA Coach's Hall of Fame in 2001 and the Kansas Sports Hall of Fame in 2018.

== Sportsmanship ==
Helmer is known not only for his ability to produce both athletic and academic All-Americans, He is considered by peers to be a true fair-play sportsman. This sense of fair play is reflected in the statement by McPherson College head coach Dave Smith concerning a chance that Helmer had to secure home-field advantage for the 2005 regional cross country meet.

"When I heard about the (NAIA region) realignment, I thought Jim (Helmer at Southwestern) would want to host the meet at his place. But, when Jim called he said he was already hosting his own meet and the KCAC meet, and he didn’t feel right about hosting three meets on his course."

This sense of sportsmanship and fair play has appeared to "rub off" on the teams he coaches. One day at practice in 2002, an alleged shoplifting youth ran into the cross country team. While attempting to make his escape, the team scattered and chased him down, turning him in to local police.

== Coaching history ==
=== Winfield High School ===
Helmer started his coaching career as the track and cross country coach at Winfield High School in Winfield, Kansas, in 1971 and coached for seven years. During this time, his teams won state championships in cross country in 1973 and 1974. The boys track teams won regional championships in 1977 and 1978 and the school won the first league track crown in school history.

=== Southwestern College ===
In 1978 Helmer became the head cross country and men's track & field coach at his alma mater. After finishing third in the KCAC cross country championships in 1978 and 1979, Helmer's cross country runners have won 31 straight men's KCAC fall cross country championships from 1980 to 2010. Friends University stopped the streak in 2011 under head coach Brad Peterson . He also coached the Men's Track & Field team to 29 consecutive conference crowns 1983-2011 after four straight second-place finishes.

Helmer's work has produced a total of seven NAIA national champions in men's cross country and track. 81 of his athletes have earned NAIA All-American status a total of 188 times, and 440 separate athletes have earned All-Conference status during his tenure.

== Coaching awards ==
Helmer was placed in the Southwestern College Athletic Hall of Fame in 1991 and was elected to the NAIA Coach's Hall of Fame in 2001. He has also been recognized 82 "Coach of the Year" awards at the conference, regional, district, and area levels. While coach of the Moundbuilder men's track and cross country program at Southwestern, Helmer been given the following coaching awards:

1. KCAC Cross Country Coach of the Year 26 times
2. KCAC Men's Track Coach of the Year 1983 through 2007
3. NAIA District 10 Cross Country Coach of the Year 1984–1987, 1989, 1990, 1992, and 1993
4. NAIA District 10 Track Coach of the Year 1983–1991, 1993, and 1994
5. NAIA Area Three Track Coach of the Year 1983, 1984, 1986, 1987
6. NAIA Area Three cross country in 1992 and 1993.
7. NAIA Great Plains Region Cross Country Coach of the Year in 1994
8. NAIA Region IV Coach of the Year in 2000, 2005, and 2007
9. NAIA Region IV Indoor Track Coach of the Year in 2006 and 2007
10. NAIA Region IV Outdoor Track Coach of the Year in 2007
11. Kansas Sports Hall of Fame in 2018

In addition to his accomplishments as a coach, Helmer is the past president of the NAIA Track Coach Association and NAIA Cross Country Coaches Association.

== Personal life ==
Helmer resides in Winfield, Kansas, with his wife Deb. He earned his bachelor's degree from Southwestern College and a master's degree from Wichita State University. Two of his children have gone on to earn All-American status at the collegiate level.
