= Jay Mack Love =

American football player and coach (1883–1935)

Biographical details
- Born: May 15, 1883; Audubon, Iowa, U.S.
- Died: September 16, 1935 (aged 52); Los Angeles, California, U.S.

Playing career
- 1904–1905: Michigan
- Position: Guard

Coaching career (HC unless noted)
- 1906–1907: Southwestern (KS)

Head coaching record
- Overall: 8–6–2

Jay Mack Love Jr. (May 15, 1883 – September 16, 1935) was an American college football player and coach who later became a practicing attorney in Arkansas City, Kansas.

== Playing career ==
Love played for the University of Michigan from 1904 until 1905 under head coach Fielding H. Yost. He was a reserve player for the undefeated team of 1904 and started at right guard for the 1905 team.

== Coaching career ==
After finishing his playing career at Michigan, Love was named the third head football coach for the Southwestern College in Winfield, Kansas serving for two years, from 1906 to 1907, compiled a record of 8–6–2.

== Late life and death ==
Love moved to California in 1908, and became a real estate broker. He died on September 16, 1935, at his home in Los Angeles.

== Head coaching record ==
Year	Team	Overall	Conference	Standing	Bowl/playoffs
Southwestern Methodists (Independent) (1906–1907)
1906	Southwestern	3–5			
1907	Southwestern	5–1–2			
Southwestern:		8–6–2			
Total:		8–6–2			
