= Mike Kirkland (coach) =

Current position
- Title: Athletic Director; Head Coach, Women's T&F
- Team: Southwestern College

Playing career
- 1978-1980: Cloud County CC
- 1980-1982: Southwestern College
- Positions: Sprints, Hurdles, and Relay

Coaching career (HC unless noted)
- 1992-present: Southwestern (Women's Track)
- 1982-present: Southwestern (Men's Track Asst.)

Accomplishments and honors

Awards
- KCAC 15-time KCAC Women's Track Coach of the Year (11 consecutive)

Mike Kirkland is the former athletic director and current Head Women's Track & Field Coach at Southwestern College in Winfield, Kansas.

== Coaching success ==
As of 2008, every team he has served as head coach has won its conference championship and 11 of his 12 years as a head coach he has been named KCAC Women's Track Coach of the Year. His teams have amassed a 393–33 record (.922) and have not lost to a conference team since he took the helm in 1992. Peers have stated this success is attributed to the consistency of his coaching style.

== Personal athletic success ==
As a student at Southwestern, Kirkland was a National Association of Intercollegiate Athletics Academic All-American, a member of the Southwestern College record-setting 440-yard and 4 x 100 meter relay teams, and competed in the National Championships each of his two seasons at Southwestern.
