= Gordon Young (composer) =

American organist and composer

Gordon Young (October 15, 1919 – October 2, 1998) was an American organist and composer of both organ and choral works.

== Biography ==
Gordon Young was born in McPherson, Kansas on October 15, 1919. He earned a bachelor's degree in music at Southwestern College, Winfield. He then began studying organ with Alexander McCurdy at the Curtis Institute of Music, Philadelphia.
