= KSWC-LP =

Radio station at Southwestern College in Winfield, Kansas, United States

- Winfield, Kansas; United States
- Broadcast area: Winfield area
- Frequency: 94.7 MHz

Programming
- Format: CHR

Ownership
- Owner: Southwestern College

History
- Former call signs: KLAS, KSWC (1968–2015)
- Former frequencies: 88.3 MHz (1968–79), 100.3 MHz (1979–2015)
- Call sign meaning: Southwestern College

Technical information
- Licensing authority: FCC
- Facility ID: 191481
- Class: L1
- ERP: 76 watts
- HAAT: 34.18 meters
- Transmitter coordinates: 37°14′45.00″N 96°58′15.00″W

Links
- Public license information: LMS
- Webcast: http://tunein.com/radio/Jinx-Radio-1003-s35542/
- Website: http://www.jinxradio.com/

KSWC-LP (94.7 FM) (Jinx Radio) is a radio station operated by students at Southwestern College in Winfield, Kansas, United States. Between 1968 and 2015, the station was a Class D full-power station licensed to broadcast with 9 watts.

== History ==
Students who were interested in radio formed a radio club at Southwestern in the late 1940s. The students used the facilities of KNIC, a local radio station to learn more about the craft. During the 1960s, Southwestern's radio station used the call letters KLAS and was a 'carrier current' station on the Southwestern campus, broadcasting through the electrical circuits of the dorms and other buildings on campus. Those were the only places KLAS was heard.

On June 4, 1968, Southwestern was granted an official FCC license and began broadcasting with a transmitter purchased from Kappa Mu Psi, a fraternity at Wichita State University, for $125.

After considering different call letters such as WSCW, KSCW, KLAS and KWKS, the official decision was to use the call letters KSWC (Kansas SouthWestern College). Dr. Wallace Gray was acting sponsor for KSWC and the format included programs such as The Sound of Thought With Dr. Wallace Gray (and his faithful floating five) which aired at 8 pm Tuesday evenings and The Lunch Break weekdays at noon. The daily sign on was This is KSWC-FM 88.3 megahertz, signing on the air for another evening of broadcasting. Located on the campus of Southwestern College in Winfield, Kansas, KSWC-FM is owned by the student body and operated by the radio club of Southwestern College, providing the Winfield area with educational and entertaining features from six to twelve PM seven days a week. We hope you enjoy this evening's program. For over a decade, the station was located at 88.3 FM on the radio dial, but in 1979, new FCC regulations forced the 10-watt station to move into the commercial bandwidth at 100.3 FM, where the station would remain until converting to an LPFM license.

=== 1980–1985 ===
Dr. William DeArmond took over leadership of KSWC in the late 1970s and made many improvements, including the location of the radio station. To that point, the radio station had several different homes. The first was in the Christy Administration Building during the days of the current carrier station. After KSWC became FCC-licensed, the station moved to Stewart Field House, then moved twice within the fieldhouse.

In 1980, KSWC's growth began as the staff grew from 7 students to over 40 by 1984, and broadcast hours increased from 21 hours a week to 105 hours a week. The studio at the time consisted of two small rooms complete with cement floors and gutted plaster walls, but at a cost of over $4000, the studio was completely rebuilt and outfitted with new equipment.

Throughout the early 1980s, KSWC became very popular in the area. Listeners branded KSWC as a non-commercial alternative to other commercial stations in the area, and was the only station with the freedom to play unique music, from indie to grunge, Top 40 to Nashville, funk to punk, gospel to jazz, disco, rock, classical, easy listening, and new wave music.

In 1983–84, KSWC was the victim of two major thefts, which crippled the station. Each theft closed the station for a day. Over $1200 worth of radio equipment was stolen and never recovered. After the second theft, the station installed a grill over the station window, and a radio student donated the use of his own personal equipment for broadcasting.

=== 1985–2005 ===
Throughout the second half of the 1980s, the 1990s, and the first few years in the new century, student involvement fluctuated, so the total hours per week and programming also fluctuated. During this time, however, the radio station moved to its current location, and actually to the same building that first housed KSWC: the Christy Administration Building basement. Dr. DeArmond continued leadership of the station during this time, as student managers came and went with the years, but one thing did not change: DJs still had the freedom to play what they wanted during their 3-hour weekly volunteer shift. DJs were required to play 15 of 30 weekly playlists, during their shifts; a student programming manager set the playlist each week. The standard broadcast day during those years was Sunday-Friday from 3 pm to midnight.

From 2003–2005, KSWC DJs Kate Hutchens, Travis Phillips, Paul Farney, Craig Fisher, Levi Hillman, and Christy Hopkins pioneered a morning radio show called "AM Mayhem," which aired weekdays from 7 am to 9 am. AM Mayhem featured a two-DJ music show format, plus morning news and weather updates, and featured the diverse musical tastes of its hosts. Hosts would often host trivia call-ins for listeners, with quiz winners winning small prizes in their campus mailboxes.

In the 2004–05 school year, DJ Paul Farney began announcing Southwestern basketball games with Curt Caden. The games were streamed live and produced by KSWC's Travis Phillips. Because the station lacked a delay, DJs were not allowed to take live calls from listeners, but basketball games and other station programming were available online. For the first time, listeners from around the world could listen to this 10 watt station.

=== 2005–2015 ===
In 2005, Dr. DeArmond stepped down as faculty General Manager and Advisor of KSWC-FM, and J.T.(Tom) Jacobs, chair of the Communication/Computer Science Division became interim faculty advisor during an overhaul of Southwestern's communications division. KSWC received a face-lift, including brand new computer hardware and software, a full production studio, and stronger capabilities for shows, recording and streaming audio. In addition, the studio was fully carpeted and ventilated.

In August 2005, Jacobs turned over day-to-day leadership to student General Manager, Kelly Burgar and student Program Director, Tommy Castor. After 5 months off the air, 2 months of technical updates (including song additions into a new automated system), a new moniker (100.3 The Jinx) and slogan The Station at the Top of the Hill and a staff of approximately 16 students, KSWC-FM went on the air at midnight on October 15, 2005 with Collective Soul's 'Better Now.'

KSWC's management kept the standard DJ volunteer shifts from Sunday-Friday from 3 pm-midnight, but ran the station in automation overnights, mornings and early afternoon hours. Several talk shows were born and eventually found a home weeknights at 9 pm. Hourly newscasts covered sports and local news, and Southwestern football and basketball games with Curt Caden found a steady home on the station.

Currently (2013), Jevyn Voss is the General Manager of KSWC. Tommy Castor, now an employee at Channel 96.3 of Clear Channel Wichita as well as at Southwestern College, advises KSWC.

=== Conversion to an LPFM license ===
In 2014, Southwestern College applied for a low-power FM license that would afford it increased protection and power compared to that it had enjoyed as a Class D station limited to 10 watts. In April 2015, KSWC-LP 94.7 went on the air with an effective radiated power of 76 watts. On July 20, 2015, the college surrendered the Class D KSWC license to the FCC, who cancelled it on July 27, 2015.

== Programming ==
Beginning in August 2005, when KSWC became a 24-hour radio station, the automated music began as widespread as DJ board shifts with hits from rock, pop, country, R&B/hip-hop, AC, Christian, and Top 40. However, as of August 7, 2007, the presence of Country, R&B, and Christian hits are almost non-existent. Now whenever KSWC is automated, hits from the world of rock, pop, AC and Top 40 are played so KSWC could be considered as a joint format with Modern Rock/Top 40/Hot AC/Alternative. KSWC also maintains a Top 30 list of songs played on the station. Beginning during the fall semester of 2007, KSWC tweaked their rotation and became more current heavy and played a format that combines Hot AC and CHR formats.

Back on December 3, 2008, for the holiday season, KSWC flipped to all Top 40/Rock Christmas songs, in part to accommodate a remodeling session for the station toward the end of December. This marked the first time that KSWC has flipped to all Christmas; in the past, they programmed in a Christmas section, but never their full playlist until then.

Since 2004, the station featured talk shows about sports, music, campus events and entertainment.

== Sports ==
Beginning in 2004, KSWC became the flagship station of Southwestern College sporting events with Paul Farney and Curt Caden simulcasting on KSWC FM, online at buildersports.com, and on local cable channel 21. In 2003, Paul Farney became the student color commentator with Travis Phillips and Kelly Burgar as in-studio engineers and Tad Humphries as the chief engineer. After Farney and Phillips' graduation, Tommy Castor became color commentator, and Kelly Burgar became sole in-studio engineer. After Burgar's graduation in 2006, Castor, along with Nate Jones and Anthony Cook began rotating between color commentator and in-studio engineer. KSWC, as part of the Moundbuilder Sports Network broadcasts all of SC's football games and most of the men and women's basketball games.

In March 2008, after a 4-year run, Tommy Castor stepped down as primary color commentator for the Moundbuilder Sports Network. Former Southwestern football player and current DJ for 100.3 The Jinx, Matt Webb, then joined Curt Caden in the broadcast booth for the fall 2008 football season. Castor rejoined the Moundbuilder Sports Network as an on-air analyst for home games and as primary substitute for both home and away games.

With the technical support of long-time Southwestern Football Film Crew Legleiter Video Productions, The Moundbuilder Sports Network debuted the first three-person on-air crew at the Southwestern College vs. University of Saint Mary football game in 2009.

For the 2009–10 football and basketball seasons, Curt Caden was joined again by Tommy Castor, now a graduate student at SC and current advisor of KSWC radio. When Caden or Castor was absent, Keith Anglemyer was primary fill in. Anglemyer also served as sideline reporter for several home football games in the 2009 season.

For the 2010–11 Moundbuilder Football seasons, Curt Caden was joined again with longtime KSWC Color Commentator Tommy Castor.

== See also ==
- Campus radio
- List of college radio stations in the United States
