= Brad Long (actor) =

American actor

Personal information
- Born: June 14, 1962 (age 64)
- Education: Southwestern College (BBA)

Sport
- Sport: Basketball
- College team: Southwestern

Brad Long (born June 14, 1962) is an American motivational speaker, former actor, and former college athlete.

== Education ==
Long played college basketball for the Southwestern Moundbuilders. Long graduated from Southwestern College in 1985, where he earned a Bachelor of Business Administration.

== Career ==
Long is best known for his role in the 1986 film Hoosiers, where he portrayed the character of basketball team captain "Buddy" Walker who is at the first meeting with new coach Norman Dale disrespectful and dismissed from the team before it even practices but later rejoins the team and before the state championship game asks the team to win it "for coach who got us here." Long did not pursue a career in acting after Hoosiers, and later became a motivational speaker. Long is also a church deacon. Long was featured in the May 2004 issue of Indianapolis Monthly after it was believed that he had appeared in an erotic B-movie called Exit. It was later discovered that the actor in the film was another Brad Long.

Long has toured the country as a speaker, visiting schools and sports teams. Long has also been featured on The Dan Patrick Show and WROK-AM.

Long now works as a sales representative for Jostens.

== Personal life ==
Long and his wife, Lisa, reside in Whiteland, Indiana. He has two children, Shelby and Landry.
