= Sunflower Bowl =

Sunflower Bowl (defunct)
- Sunflower Bowl
- Stadium: Sonner Stadium
- Location: Winfield, Kansas
- Operated: 1982–1986

The Sunflower Bowl was a National Association of Intercollegiate Athletics post-season college football bowl game played in Winfield, Kansas from 1982 to 1986.

== Game results ==
Date	Winner		Loser		Location	Ref.
November 20, 1982	Southwestern College	15	Oklahoma Panhandle State	0	Winfield, Kansas	
November 19, 1983	Missouri Valley	51	Southwestern College	21	Winfield, Kansas	
November 17, 1984	Oklahoma Panhandle State	10	Iowa Wesleyan	7	Winfield, Kansas	
November 16, 1985	Baker	29	Southwestern College	0	Winfield, Kansas	
November 15, 1986	Tarleton State	40	Benedictine	38	Winfield, Kansas	

== See also ==
- List of college bowl games
