= Southwestern Moundbuilders football =

College Football Team

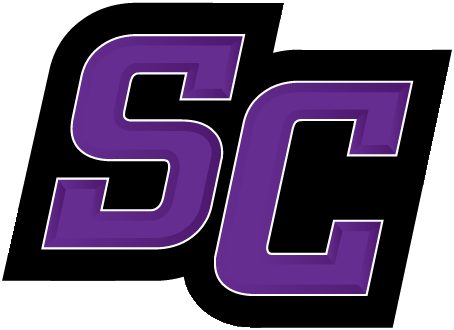
- First season: 1903; 123 years ago
- Head coach: Brad Griffin; 11th season, 73–47 (.608)
- Location: Winfield, Kansas
- League: NAIA
- Conference: Kansas Collegiate Athletic Conference
- Colors: Purple and white
- Bowl record: 2–2 (.500)

Conference championships
- 12
- Consensus All-Americans: 40
- Website: buildersports.com/football

The Southwestern Moundbuilders football team represents Southwestern College in college football.

== History ==
The team began in 1903 with 9 wins, 5 losses, and 1 tie under coach J. J. Thiel. Since then the Builders have posted three undefeated seasons: 1913, 1918, and 1967. There has never been a season of Southwestern College Football without at least one victory.

=== Conference affiliations ===
Years	Conference
1895–1923	Independent
1924–1926	KCAC
1927–1927	Independent
1928–1958	CIAC
1959–1959	Independent
1960–present	KCAC

== Coaches ==
The current head football coach is Brad Griffin, who took over the program in 2015. Griffin was the defensive coordinator for eleven seasons with William Penn University prior to his arrival to Southwestern College. Other coaches during the program's history include Art Kahler, Harold Elliott, and Dennis Franchione.

== Conference championships ==
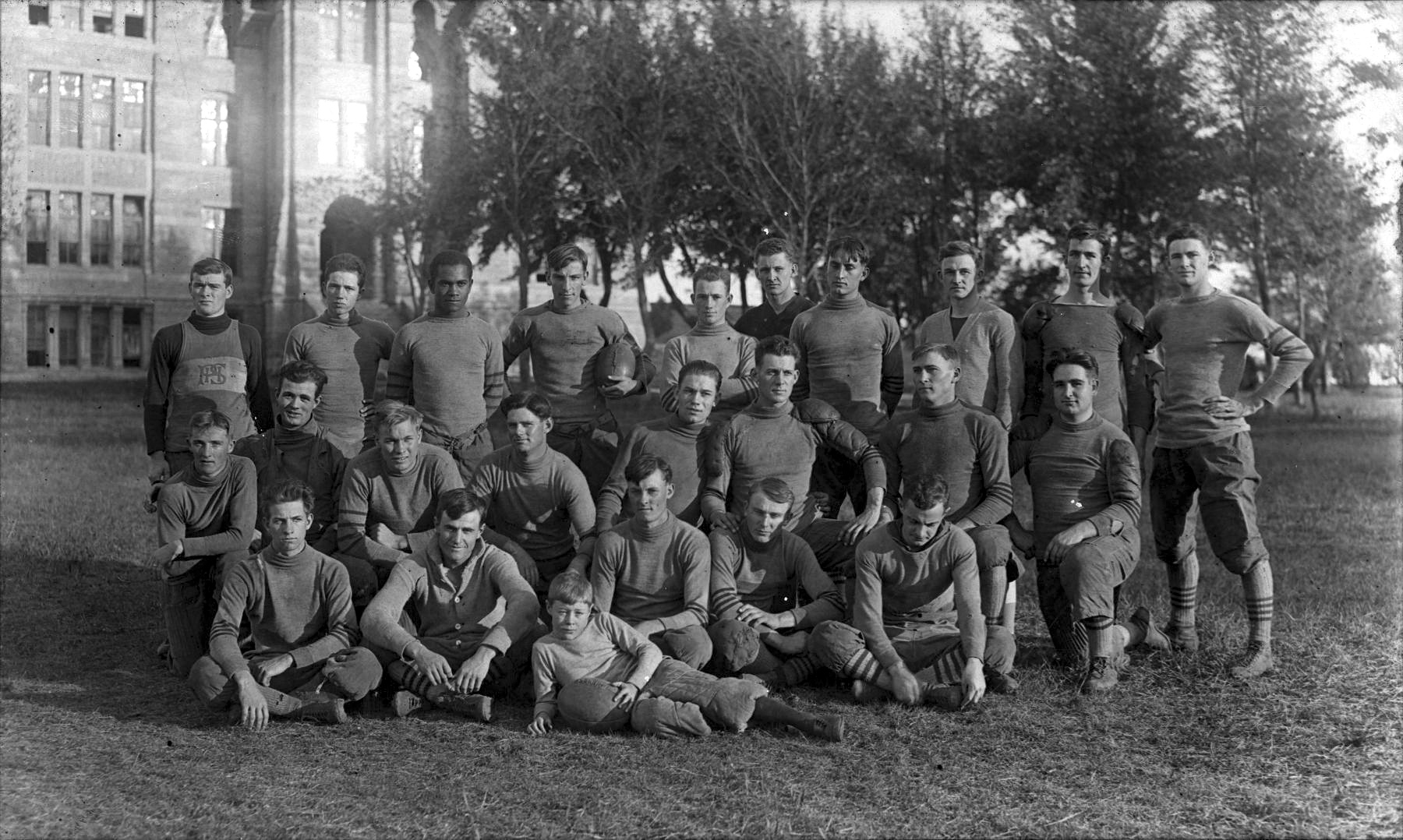
1913 Southwestern Moundbuilders football team won the Kansas State Championship

Southwestern football teams have won the Kansas Collegiate Athletic Conference eleven times since 1929: 1964, 1967, 1968, 1982, 1983, 1985, 1987, 1997, 1998, 1999, and 2021. They also were declared the Kansas State Champions in 1913.

== Post-season and bowl games ==
Southwestern has participated in 4 bowl games with an overall record of 2 wins and 2 losses. The team has also advanced to the NAIA Football National Championship five times, with a record of 2 wins and 5 losses. The Moundbuilder's total post-season record is 4 wins and 7 losses in 11 post-season games.

In 1982, head coach Dennis Franchione led the Moundbuilders to 9 wins and 2 losses, with a conference championship and a win in the Sunflower Bowl. Charlie Cowdrey followed up the next year with an appearance in the Sunflower bowl, and then again in 1985.

1984 was the first year that Southwestern qualified for the NAIA Football National Championship. The first round the team defeated conference rival Bethel 17–14, but then lost to Northwestern College by a score of 45-23.

1996 saw Southwestern post its second bowl victory in the Wheat Bowl, defeating Baker University 28-20 under head coach Monty Lewis.

After the 1997 regular season, the team played in the National Championship, losing 53–28 to Doane College.

It was in 1998 when Southwestern saw some post-season success once again and advanced to the quarterfinals of the NAIA Football National Championship. The Moundbuilders defeated the Lindenwood Lions 12–10 in the first round and then lost 52–6 to Si Tanka (SD).

For the 1999 NAIA Football National Championship, the team lost in the first round to Northwestern Oklahoma State by a score of 44–10.

Date	Result	Bowl	Rival	Score	Head coach
1982	W	Sunflower Bowl	Oklahoma Panhandle	15–0	Dennis Franchione
1983	L	Sunflower Bowl	Missouri Valley	21–51	Charlie Cowdrey
1984	W L	1st round National Championship; Quarterfinals National Championship	Bethel; Northwestern (Iowa)	17–14; 23–45	Charlie Cowdrey
1985	L	Sunflower Bowl	Baker	0–29	Charlie Cowdrey
1996	W	Wheat Bowl	Baker	28–20	Monty Lewis
1997	L	1st round National Championship	Doane	53–29	Monty Lewis
1998	W L	1st round National Championship; Quarterfinals National Championship	Lindenwood; Si Tanka (SD)	12–10; 6–52	Monty Lewis
1999	L	1st round National Championship	Northwestern Oklahoma	44–10	Monty Lewis
