= Kansas Collegiate Athletic Conference =

NAIA conference

- Formerly: Kansas Intercollegiate Athletic Association; Kansas Intercollegiate Athletic Conference; Kansas College Athletic Conference
- Association: NAIA
- Founded: 1890; 136 years ago
- Commissioner: Ted Breidenthal (since 2023)
- Sports fielded: 21; men's: 10; women's: 11
- No. of teams: 14
- Headquarters: Wichita, Kansas
- Website: kcacsports.com

Locations
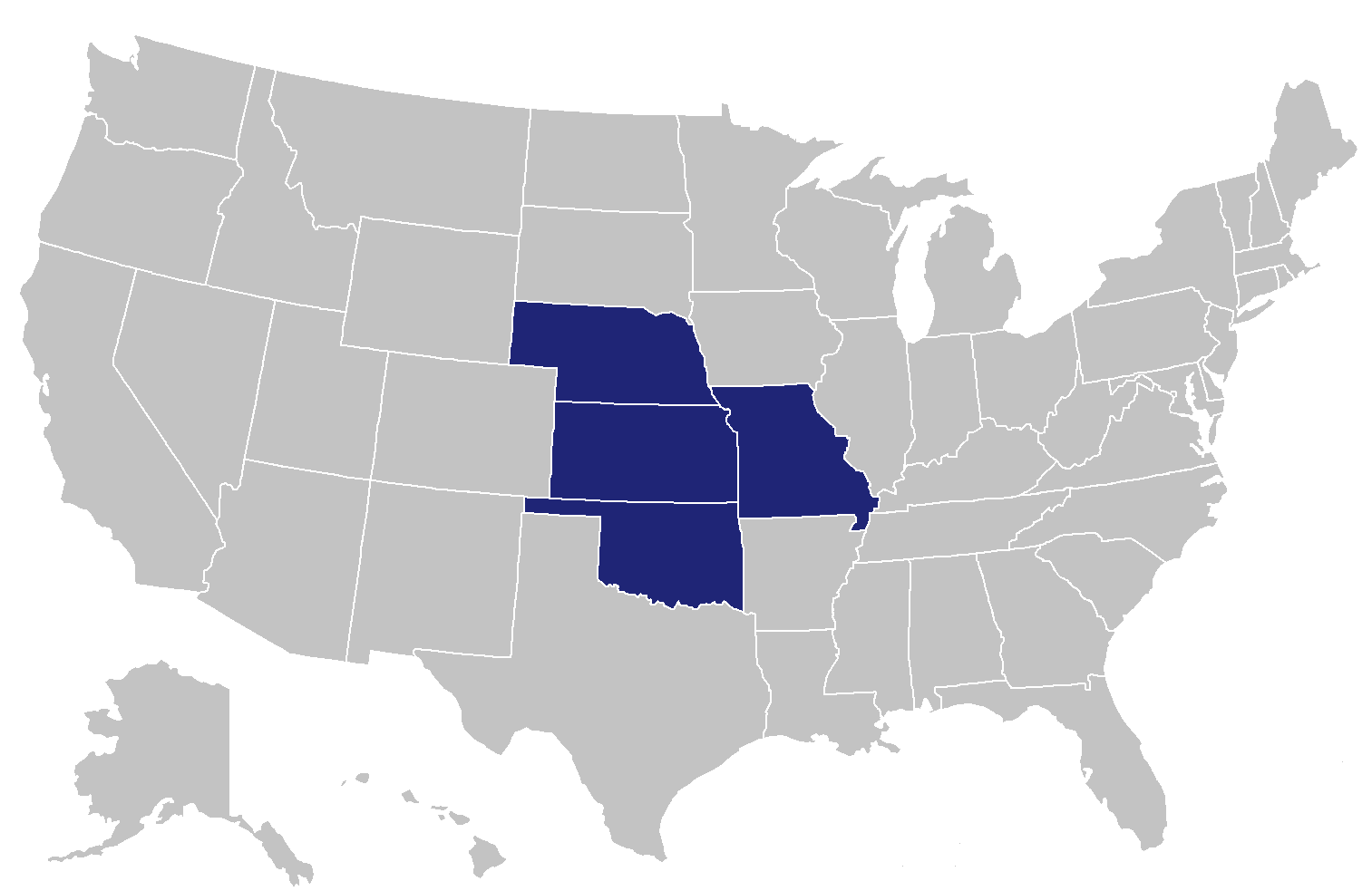

The Kansas Collegiate Athletic Conference (KCAC) is a college athletic conference affiliated with the National Association of Intercollegiate Athletics (NAIA). The KCAC is the oldest conference in the NAIA and the second-oldest in the United States, tracing its history to 1890.

== History ==
On February 15, 1890, the Kansas Intercollegiate Athletic Association was formed; it was the first successful attempt to organize Kansas colleges for the purposes of promoting and regulating amateur intercollegiate athletics. In addition to the private universities and colleges, the conference also included Kansas State Agriculture College (now Kansas State University), the University of Kansas, and Washburn University. In November of that year, the first college football game in Kansas was played between the Kansas Jayhawks and Baker University.

About 1902 the association allied with the Kansas College Athletic Conference, the first group to adopt a definite set of rules and regulations. By the 1920s the conference had changed its name to Kansas Collegiate Athletic Conference and had grown to include 17 regular members and 2 allied members (no longer including the University of Kansas or Kansas State). In 1927, seven colleges withdrew to form the Central Intercollegiate Conference.

On December 1, 1928, the Kansas Intercollegiate Athletic Conference was formally disbanded and replaced by a new Kansas College Athletic Conference which included six members and formed the present legal entity. It was commonly referred to as the "Little Six", in contrast to the Big Six Conference that eventually became the current Big 12. By 1968 the conference grew to include 12 members. It was organized into Northern and Southern divisions until 1970 when three colleges withdrew to join Missouri-based conferences. In the mid-1970s the name was changed to its current form.

=== 1905 night game ===
See 1905 Cooper vs. Fairmount football game

In the 1905 season, the Coleman Company set up temporary gas-powered lighting for a night game at Association Park in Wichita, Kansas between the Cooper Barrelmakers of Cooper College (now Sterling College) and the Fairmount Wheatshockers of Fairmount College (now Wichita State University). It was the first night football game played west of the Mississippi River. Fairmount won the game, 24–0.

=== 1905 "experimental" game ===
See 1905 Washburn vs. Fairmount football game

On December 25, 1905, Fairmount played a game against the Washburn Ichabods using a set of experimental rules. The game was officiated by then Washburn head coach John H. Outland.

The experiment was considered a failure. Outland commented, "It seems to me that the distance required in three downs would almost eliminate touchdowns, except through fakes or flukes." The Los Angeles Times reported that there was much kicking and that the game was considered much safer than regular play, but that the new rule was not "conducive to the sport."

In his history of the sport of football, David M. Nelson concluded that "the first forward passes were thrown at the end of the 1905 season in a game between Fairmount and Washburn colleges in Kansas." According to Nelson, Washburn completed three passes, and Fairmount completed two.

=== Chronological timeline ===
Kansas Collegiate Athletic Conference
Location of KCAC members: current (with football), current (non-football)
- 1902 – The Kansas Collegiate Athletic Conference (KCAC) was founded as the Kansas Intercollegiate Athletic Conference (KIAC). Charter members included Baker University, Bethany College, Bethel College, the College of Emporia (CoE), Cooper Memorial College (now Sterling College), Fairmount College (now Wichita State University), Friends University, Kansas Wesleyan University, Kansas State Teachers College of Emporia (now Emporia State University), Kansas State Teachers College of Hays (now Fort Hays State University), Kansas State Teachers College of Pittsburg (now Pittsburg State University), Kansas State Agricultural College (now Kansas State University), McPherson College, Ottawa University, St. Benedict's College (now Benedictine College), St. Mary's College (now Saint Mary's Academy and College), Southwest Kansas Conference College (now Southwestern College), Washburn College (now Washburn University) as full members (with St. John's College and Kansas City University as allied members), beginning the 1902–03 academic year.
- 1913 – Kansas State left the KIAC to join the Missouri Valley Intercollegiate Athletic Association (MVIAA) after the 1912–13 academic year.
- 1923 – Nine institutions left the KIAC to join their respective new home primary conferences: The College of Emporia, Emporia State, Fort Hays State, Pittsburg State, Southwestern (Ks.), Washburn and Wichita State to form the Central Intercollegiate Athletic Conference (CIC), and Kansas City U. and St. John's (Ks.) as Independents, all effective after the 1922–23 academic year.
- 1928:
  - Bethel (Ks.), Friends, Sterling and St. Benedict's (Ks.) left the KIAC to become Independents, effective in December 1928 (during the 1928–29 academic year).
  - The KIAC was rebranded as the Kansas College Athletic Conference (KCAC), effective in December 1928 (during the 1928–29 academic year).
- 1931 – St. Mary's (Ks.) left the KCAC as the school ceased operations after the 1930–31 academic year.
- 1933 – The College of Emporia (CoE) rejoined the KCAC in the 1933–34 academic year.
- 1939 – Bethel (Ks.) rejoined the KCAC in the 1939–40 academic year.
- 1953 – Friends rejoined the KCAC in the 1953–54 academic year.
- 1958 – Southwestern (Ks.) and Sterling rejoined the KCAC, in the 1958–59 academic year.
- 1968 – St. Mary of the Plains College and Tabor College joined the KCAC in the 1968–69 academic year.
- 1970 – The KCAC has been rebranded as the Kansas Collegiate Athletic Conference (KCAC), beginning the 1970–71 academic year.
- 1971 – Baker, the College of Emporia (CoE) and Ottawa left the KCAC to form part of the Heart of America Athletic Conference (HAAC) after the 1970–71 academic year.
- 1982 – Ottawa rejoined the KCAC in the 1982–83 academic year.
- 1992 – St. Mary's of the Plains left the KCAC as the school ceased operations after the 1991–92 academic year.
- 1999 – The Saint Mary College of Leavenworth (now the University of Saint Mary) joined the KCAC in the 1999–2000 academic year.
- 2015:
  - Oklahoma Wesleyan University joined the KCAC in the 2015–16 academic year.
  - Six institutions joined the KCAC as associate members, all effective in the 2016 spring season (2015–16 academic year):
    - St. Gregory's University for men's lacrosse
    - Midland University and Johnson & Wales University–Colorado for women's lacrosse
    - and Benedictine [formerly St. Benedict's (Ks.)], Clarke University and Missouri Valley College (now Missouri Valley University) for men's and women's lacrosse
- 2016:
  - St. Gregory's (Okla.) left the KCAC as an associate member for men's lacrosse after the school suspended it during the 2016 spring season (2015–16 academic year).
  - York College (now York University) joined the KCAC (coming from the defunct Midlands Collegiate Athletic Conference (MCAC)) in the 2016–18 academic year.
  - St. Ambrose University joined the KCAC as an associate member for men's lacrosse in the 2017 spring season (2016–17 academic year).
- 2017 – Five institutions joined the KCAC as associate members (and/or added other single sports into their associate memberships), all effective in the 2017–18 academic year:
  - Columbia College of Missouri for men's lacrosse
  - St. Ambrose for women's lacrosse
  - and the University of Jamestown, Midland and Missouri Valley for women's wrestling
- 2018:
  - Johnson & Wales–Colorado left the KCAC as an associate member for women's lacrosse after the 2018 spring season (2017–18 academic year).
  - Avila University joined the KCAC in the 2018–19 academic year.
- 2019 – Seven institutions joined the KCAC as associate members (and/or added other single sports into their associate memberships), all effective in the 2019–20 academic year:
  - Culver–Stockton College for women's lacrosse
  - Lincoln College and Olivet Nazarene University for men's and women's swimming
  - Midland for men's lacrosse and men's and women's swimming
  - and Missouri Baptist University, Morningside College (now Morningside University) and William Penn University for men's and women's lacrosse
- 2020:
  - Missouri Valley left the KCAC as an associate member for women's wrestling after the 2019–20 academic year.
  - Five institutions joined the KCAC as associate members (and/or added other single sports into their associate memberships), all effective in the 2020–21 academic year:
    - Bethel University of Indiana and Morningside for men's and women's swimming
    - Cottey College and Midland for women's flag football
    - Hastings College for women's wrestling
- 2021:
  - Lincoln (Ill.) left the KCAC as an associate member for men's and women's swimming after the 2020–21 academic year.
  - Two institutions joined the KCAC as associate members (and/or added other single sports into their associate memberships), both effective in the 2021–22 academic year:
    - Columbia (Mo.) for eSports
    - and Jamestown for women's swimming
- 2022:
  - Seven institutions left the KCAC as associate members (and/or removed some single sports into their associate memberships), all effective after the 2022 spring season (2021–22 academic year):
    - Culver–Stockton for women's lacrosse
    - and Benedictine, Clarke, Missouri Valley, Morningside, St. Ambrose and William Penn for men's and women's lacrosse
  - Four institutions joined the KCAC as associate members (and/or added other single sports into their associate memberships), all effective in the 2022–23 academic year:
    - the University of Health Sciences and Pharmacy in St. Louis (UHSP) for women's lacrosse
    - the College of Saint Mary for women's swimming
    - Aquinas College for men's and women's swimming
    - and Doane University for women's wrestling
- 2023:
  - Columbia (Mo.) left the KCAC as an associate member for eSports after the 2022–23 academic year.
  - Evangel University joined the KCAC in the 2023–24 academic year.
  - Four institutions joined the KCAC as associate members (and/or added other single sports into their associate memberships), all effective in the 2023–24 academic year:
    - Dakota Wesleyan University and Morningside for women's wrestling
    - and Baker University and Graceland University for women's flag football
- 2024 – Eight institutions left the KCAC as associate members (and/or removed some single sports into their associate memberships), all effective after the 2023–24 academic year:
  - Columbia (Mo.) for men's lacrosse
  - Missouri Baptist for men's and women's lacrosse
  - the UHSP for women's lacrosse
  - Midland for men's and women's lacrosse and women's wrestling
  - and Dakota Wesleyan, Doane, Hastings and Morningside for women's wrestling, and for men's and women's lacrosse

== Member schools ==
=== Current members ===
The KCAC currently has fourteen full members, all are private schools:

Institution	Location	Founded	Affiliation	Enrollment	Nickname	Joined (Note: Represents the calendar year when fall sports competition begins.)
Avila University	Kansas City, Missouri	1916	Catholic (C.S.J.)	2,768	Eagles	2018
Bethany College	Lindsborg, Kansas	1881	Lutheran ELCA	615	Swedes	1902
Bethel College	North Newton, Kansas	1887	Mennonite	509	Threshers	1902; 1939 (Note: Bethel (Ks.) left the KCAC in December 1928 (during the 1928–29 school year) before rejoining in the 1939–40 school year.)
Evangel University	Springfield, Missouri	1955	Assemblies of God	2,289	Valor	2023
Friends University	Wichita, Kansas	1898	Nondenominational	1,961	Falcons	1902; 1953 (Note: Friends left the KCAC in December 1928 (during the 1928–29 school year) before rejoining in the 1953–54 school year.)
Kansas Wesleyan University	Salina, Kansas	1886	United Methodist	1,021	Coyotes	1902
McPherson College	McPherson, Kansas	1887	Brethren	878	Bulldogs	1902
Oklahoma Wesleyan University	Bartlesville, Oklahoma	1972	Wesleyan Church	880	Eagles	2015
Ottawa University	Ottawa, Kansas	1865	Baptist	999	Braves	1902; 1982 (Note: Ottawa left the KCAC after the 1970–71 school year before rejoining in the 1982–83 school year.)
University of Saint Mary	Leavenworth, Kansas	1859	Catholic (S.C.L.)	1,462	Spires	1999
Southwestern College	Winfield, Kansas	1885	United Methodist	1,041	Moundbuilders	1902; 1958 (Note: Southwestern (Ks.) left the KCAC after the 1922–23 school year before rejoining in the 1958–59 school year.)
Sterling College	Sterling, Kansas	1887	Evangelical Christian	694	Warriors	1902; 1958 (Note: Sterling left the KCAC in December 1928 (during the 1928–29 school year) before rejoining in the 1958–59 school year.)
Tabor College	Hillsboro, Kansas	1908	Mennonite Brethren	621	Bluejays	1968
York University	York, Nebraska	1890	Churches of Christ	532	Panthers	2016

=== Associate members ===
The KCAC currently has ten associate members, all are private schools:

Institution	Location	Founded	Affiliation	Enrollment	Nickname	Joined (Note: Represents the calendar year when fall sports competition begins.)	KCAC sport	Primary conference
Aquinas College	Grand Rapids, Michigan	1886	Catholic (D.S.G.R.)	1,157	Saints	2022^{m.sw.} 2022^{w.sw.}	men's swimming women's swimming	Wolverine–Hoosier (WHAC)
Baker University	Baldwin City, Kansas	1858	United Methodist	2,017	Wildcats	2023	women's flag football	Heart of America (HAAC)
Bethel University	Mishawaka, Indiana	1947	Missionary	1,167	Pilots	2020^{m.sw.} 2020^{w.sw.}	men's swimming women's swimming	Crossroads
College of Saint Mary	Omaha, Nebraska	1923	Catholic (R.S.M.)	786	Flames	2022	women's swimming	Great Plains (GPAC)
Cottey College	Nevada, Missouri	1884	Nonsectarian	254	Comets	2020	women's flag football	American Midwest
Graceland University	Lamoni, Iowa	1895	Community of Christ	1,102	Yellowjackets	2023	women's flag football	Heart of America (HAAC)
Midland University (Note: Midland competed in the KCAC as an associate member for men's lacrosse from 2019–20 to 2023–24, women's lacrosse from 2015–16 to 2023–24, and women's wrestling from 2017–18 to 2023–24.)	Fremont, Nebraska	1883	Lutheran ELCA	1,558	Warriors	2019^{m.sw.} 2019^{w.sw.} 2020^{w.f.fb.}	men's swimming women's swimming women's flag football	Great Plains (GPAC)
Morningside University (Note: Morningside competed in the KCAC as an associate member for men's and women's lacrosse from 2019–20 to 2021–22, and women's wrestling during the 2023–24 school year.)	Sioux City, Iowa	1894	United Methodist	2,056	Mustangs	2020^{m.sw.} 2020^{w.sw.}	men's swimming women's swimming	Great Plains (GPAC)
Olivet Nazarene University	Bourbonnais, Illinois	1907	Nazarene	3,339	Tigers	2019^{m.sw.} 2019^{w.sw.}	men's swimming women's swimming	Chicagoland (CCAC)

=== Former members ===
The KCAC had 12 former full members, all but five were private schools:

Institution	Location	Founded	Affiliation	Nickname	Joined (Note: Represents the calendar year when fall sports competition begins.)	Left (Note: Represents the calendar year when spring sports competition ends.)	Subsequent conference(s)	Current conference
Baker University	Baldwin City, Kansas	1858	United Methodist	Wildcats	1902	1971	Heart of America (HAAC) (1971–present)	
College of Emporia	Emporia, Kansas	1882	Presbyterian	Fighting Presbies	1902; 1933	1923; 1971 (Note: The College of Emporia previously withdrew from the KCAC from 1923–24 to 1932–33.)	various (Note: The College of Emporia had various subsequent conference affiliations: the Central Intercollegiate Conference (CIC) from 1923–24 to 1932–33 and the Heart of America Athletic Conference (HAAC) from 1971–72 to 1973–74.)	Closed in 1974
Fairmont College (Note: Currently known as Wichita State University since 1964.)	Wichita, Kansas	1895	Public	Shockers	1902	1923	various (Note: Wichita State had various subsequent conference affiliations: the Central Intercollegiate Conference (CIC) from 1923–24 to 1939–40, as an NAIA Independent from 1940–41 to 1944–45, and the Missouri Valley Conference (MVC) (Note: Currently an NCAA Division I athletic conference.) from 1945–46 to 2016–17.)	American (2017–present)
Kansas City University	Kansas City, Kansas	1896	Methodist	Cowboys	1902	1923	Independent (1923–33)	Closed in 1933
Kansas State Teachers College of Emporia (Note: Currently known as Emporia State University since 1977.)	Emporia, Kansas	1863	Public	Hornets & Lady Hornets	1902	1923	various (Note: Emporia State had various subsequent conference affiliations: the Central Intercollegiate Conference (CIC) from 1923–24 to 1967–68, the Rocky Mountain Athletic Conference (RMAC) from 1968–69 to 1971–72, the Great Plains Athletic Conference (GPAC) from 1972–73 to 1975–76, the Central States Intercollegiate Conference (CSIC) from 1976–77 to 1988–89, and as an NCAA D-II Independent from 1989–90 to 1990–91.)	Mid-America (MIAA) (Note: Currently an NCAA Division II athletic conference.) (1991–present)
Kansas State Teachers College of Hays (Note: Currently known as Fort Hays State University since 1977.)	Hays, Kansas	1902	Public	Tigers	1902	1923	various (Note: Fort Hays State had various subsequent conference affiliations: the Central Intercollegiate Conference (CIC) from 1923–24 to 1967–68, the Rocky Mountain Athletic Conference (RMAC) from 1968–69 to 1971–72 (also from 1989–90 to 2005–06 in its second stint), the Great Plains Athletic Conference (GPAC) from 1972–73 to 1975–76, and the Central States Intercollegiate Conference (CSIC) from 1976–77 to 1988–89.)	Mid-America (MIAA) (2006–present)
Kansas State Teachers College of Pittsburg (Note: Currently known as Pittsburg State University since 1977.)	Pittsburg, Kansas	1903	Public	Gorillas	1902	1923	various (Note: Pittsburg State had various subsequent conference affiliations: the Central Intercollegiate Conference (CIC) from 1923–24 to 1967–68, the Rocky Mountain Athletic Conference (RMAC) from 1968–69 to 1971–72, the Great Plains Athletic Conference (GPAC) from 1972–73 to 1975–76, and the Central States Intercollegiate Conference (CSIC) from 1976–77 to 1988–89.)	Mid-America (MIAA) (1989–present)
Kansas State Agricultural College (Note: Currently known as Kansas State University since 1959.)	Manhattan, Kansas	1863	Public (Land-grant)	Wildcats	1902	1913	various (Note: Kansas State had various subsequent conference affiliations: the Missouri Valley Conference (MVC) from 1913–14 to 1927–28, and the Big Eight Conference from 1928–29 to 1995–96.)	Big 12 (1996–present)
St. Benedict's College (Note: Currently known as Benedictine College since 1971.)	Atchison, Kansas	1858	Catholic (Benedictines)	Ravens	1902	1928 (Note: Benedictine left the KCAC in December 1928 (during the 1928–29 school year).)	various (Note: Benedictine had various subsequent conference affiliations: as an Independent from January 1929 (during the 1928–29 school year) to 1936–37, the Central Intercollegiate Conference (CIC) from 1937–38 to 1961–62, and as an NAIA Independent from 1962–63 to 1990–91.)	Heart of America (HAAC) (1991–present)
St. John's College	Winfield, Kansas	1893	Lutheran LCMS	Eagles	1902	1923	Independent (1923–86)	Closed in 1986
St. Mary of the Plains College	Dodge City, Kansas	1913	Catholic (Diocese of Dodge City)	Cavaliers & Saints	1968	1992	Closed in 1992	
St. Mary's College	St. Marys, Kansas	1848	Catholic (SSPX)	Knights	1902	1931	N/A (Note: St. Mary's (Ks.) dropped its athletics program after the 1930–31 school year.)	
Washburn University	Topeka, Kansas	1865	Public	Ichabods	1902	1923	various (Note: Washburn had various subsequent conference affiliations: the Central Intercollegiate Conference (CIC) from 1923–24 to 1932–33 (also from 1940–41 to 1967–68 on its second stint), as an Independent from 1933–34 to 1939–40, the Rocky Mountain Athletic Conference (RMAC) from 1968–69 to 1971–72, the Great Plains Athletic Conference (GPAC) from 1972–73 to 1975–76, and the Central States Intercollegiate Conference (CSIC) from 1976–77 to 1988–89.)	Mid-America (MIAA) (1989–present)

=== Former associate members ===
The KCAC had four 16 associate members, all were private schools:

Institution	Location	Founded	Affiliation	Nickname	Joined (Note: Represents the calendar year when fall sports competition begins.)	Left (Note: Represents the calendar year when spring sports competition ends.)	KCAC sport	Primary conference
Benedictine College	Atchison, Kansas	1858	Catholic (Benedictines)	Ravens	2015^{m.lax.} 2015^{w.lax.}	2022^{m.lax.} 2022^{w.lax.}	men's lacrosse women's lacrosse	Heart of America (HAAC)
Clarke University	Dubuque, Iowa	1843	Catholic (B.V.M.)	Pride	2015^{m.lax.} 2015^{w.lax.}	2022^{m.lax.} 2022^{w.lax.}	men's lacrosse women's lacrosse	Heart of America (HAAC)
Columbia College of Missouri	Columbia, Missouri	1851	Nonsectarian	Cougars	2017^{m.lax.} 2021^{eSp.}	2024^{m.lax.} 2023^{eSp.}	men's lacrosse eSports	American Midwest
Culver–Stockton College	Canton, Missouri	1853	Disciples of Christ	Wildcats	2019	2022	women's lacrosse	Heart of America (HAAC)
Dakota Wesleyan University	Mitchell, South Dakota	1885	United Methodist	Tigers	2023	2024	women's wrestling	Great Plains (GPAC)
Hastings College	Hastings, Nebraska	1882	Presbyterian (PCUSA)	Broncos	2020	2024	women's wrestling	Great Plains (GPAC)
University of Jamestown	Jamestown, North Dakota	1883	Presbyterian (PCUSA)	Jimmies	2017^{w.wres.} 2021^{w.swim.}	2024^{w.wres.} 2025^{w.swim.}	women's wrestling, women's swimming	Northern Sun (NSIC) (Note: Currently an NCAA Division II athletic conference.)
Johnson & Wales University–Colorado	Denver, Colorado	1914	Nonsectarian	Wildcats	2015	2018	women's lacrosse	Closed in 2020
Lincoln College	Lincoln, Illinois	1865	Nonsectarian	Lynx	2019^{m.sw.} 2019^{w.sw.}	2021^{m.sw.} 2021^{w.sw.}	men's swimming women's swimming	Closed in 2022
Midland University (Note: Midland remains in the KCAC as an associate member for men's and women's swimming and women's flag football.)	Fremont, Nebraska	1883	Lutheran ELCA	Warriors	2019^{m.lax.} 2015^{w.lax.} 2017^{w.wr.}	2024^{m.lax.} 2024^{w.lax.} 2024^{w.wr.}	men's lacrosse women's lacrosse women's wrestling	Great Plains (GPAC)
Missouri Baptist University	Creve Coeur, Missouri	1957	Southern Baptist	Spartans	2019^{m.lax.} 2019^{w.lax.}	2024^{m.lax.} 2024^{w.lax.}	men's lacrosse women's lacrosse	American Midwest
Missouri Valley College (Note: Currently known as Missouri Valley University since 2026.)	Marshall, Missouri	1889	Presbyterian (PCUSA)	Vikings	2015^{m.lax} 2015^{w.lax.} 2017^{w.wr.}	2022^{m.lax} 2022^{w.lax.} 2020^{w.wr.}	men's swimming women's lacrosse women's wrestling	Heart of America (HAAC)
Morningside University (Note: Morningside remains in the KCAC as an associate member for men's and women's swimming.)	Sioux City, Iowa	1894	United Methodist	Mustangs	2019^{m.lax.} 2019^{w.lax.} 2023^{w.wr.}	2022^{m.lax.} 2022^{w.lax.} 2024^{w.wr.}	men's lacrosse women's lacrosse women's wrestling	Great Plains (GPAC)
St. Ambrose University	Davenport, Iowa	1882	Catholic (Diocese of Davenport)	Fighting Bees	2016^{m.lax.} 2017^{w.lax.}	2022^{m.lax.} 2022^{w.lax.}	men's lacrosse women's lacrosse	Chicagoland (CCAC)
St. Gregory's University	Shawnee, Oklahoma	1914	Catholic (Benedictines)	Cavaliers	2015	2016	men's lacrosse	Closed in 2017 (Note: St. Gregory's (Okla.) discontinued its athletic program once the school announced that it would close after the 2017 fall season (2017–18 school year).)
William Penn University	Oskaloosa, Iowa	1873	Quakers	Statesmen	2019^{m.lax.} 2019^{w.lax.}	2022^{m.lax.} 2022^{w.lax.}	men's lacrosse women's lacrosse	Heart of America (HAAC)

=== Membership timeline ===
Full member (all sports) Full member (non-football) Associate member (sport)

== Sports ==
A divisional format is used for football.
Dr. Ted Kessinger (South)
- Bethany (Ks.)
- Bethel (Ks.)
- Evangel
- Friends
- McPherson
- Southwestern (Ks.)
- Oklahoma Wesleyan (non-football)
Franklin "Gene" Bissell (North)
- Avila
- Kansas Wesleyan
- Ottawa
- Saint Mary
- Sterling
- Tabor
- York (Neb.) (non-football)

Conference sports
Sport	Men's	Women's
Baseball	✓	
Basketball	✓	✓
Cross Country	✓	✓
Football	✓	✓ (flag)
Golf	✓	✓
Lacrosse	✓	✓
Soccer	✓	✓
Softball		✓
Tennis	✓	✓
Track & Field Indoor	✓	✓
Track & Field Outdoor	✓	✓
Volleyball		✓
Wrestling	✓	

== See also ==
- 2012 Kansas Collegiate Athletic Conference football season
- List of college athletic programs in Kansas
- List of Kansas Collegiate Athletic Conference people
- Timeline of college football in Kansas
