= Southwestern College (Kansas) =

Methodist college in Winfield, Kansas, US

Coordinates: 37°14′58″N 96°58′37″W

- Former name: Southwest Kansas Conference College (1885–1909)
- Motto: Lux Esto
- Motto in English: There is Light
- Type: Private college
- Established: 1885; 141 years ago
- Affiliations: United Methodist
- President: Elizabeth Frombgen
- Faculty: 50+
- Undergraduates: 1,900
- Location: Winfield, Kansas, U.S.
- Campus: Rural, 82 acres (33 ha)
- Colors: Purple and white
- Nickname: Moundbuilders
- Sporting affiliations: NAIA – KCAC
- Website: sckans.edu

Southwestern College is a private Methodist college in Winfield, Kansas. It was founded in 1885 as Southwest Kansas Conference College and graduated its first class of three in June 1889. The name of the school was changed to its current form in 1909.

== History ==
=== Background ===
The first step towards the establishment of Southwest Kansas Conference College took place in the spring of 1884 when land was platted for the purpose east of Wichita, Kansas. With construction slated for the future, in October of that same year the principals behind the project decided to acquire a substantial residence to serve as a temporary building for the school. The Wichita home of Crokey, located on the corner of Central and Topeka Avenues, was obtained for this purpose at a cost of $4,000. Initial plans called for establishment of a school with academic departments in the fields of business, music, and art.

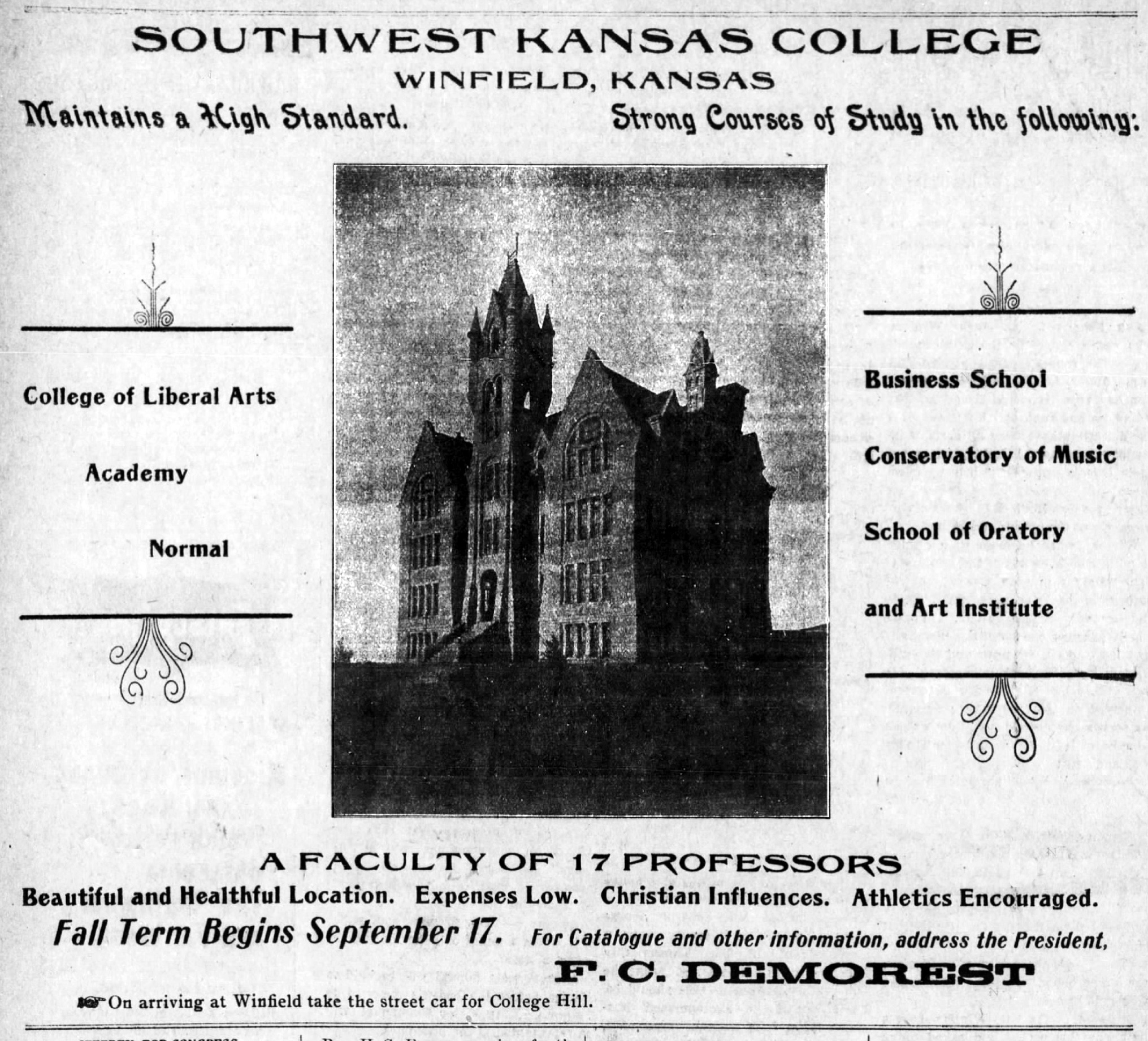
A 1901 newspaper advertisement for Southwest Kansas Conference College touting the school's "Christian influence."

The school was incorporated in Topeka on October 9, 1884, headed by a nine-member board of directors. No courses were conducted during the 1884–1885 school year, however, and the project remained dormant.

The Southwest Kansas Conference of the Methodist Church affirmed its connection with the college project at its April 1885 annual meeting at El Dorado. There the regional division of the church formally decided to establish a college within the district, selecting a committee of 7 headed by Rev. N.S. Buckner to find a suitable permanent location. Conditions established by the committee included the availability of at least 20 acres of land and community donations of at least $15,000 towards completion of the project.

The committee's decision on siting was initially slated for a meeting to be held in Wichita on May 12, 1885. This proved to be a preliminary gathering, however, at which guidelines for bids were established and interested communities made their initial presentations. Communities making initial appeals for the siting of the college included El Dorado, Harper, Newton, Peabody, Winfield, and Wichita. The towns of Hutchinson and Wellington also later made proposals. A tour of visitation by Buckner's siting committee was planned.

Formal decision was rendered at a meeting held in Wichita on June 9, 1885, at which the bid of Winfield was accepted. Winfield in its winning bid pledged $40,000 towards college construction, 20 acres of land for the campus, additional payments of $2,000 a year for ten years, and an additional 40 acres of land. The selection of Winfield was met the next day with Cowley County approving the issuance of $100,000 in bonds on behalf of the Denver, Memphis & Atlantic Railway for the expeditious construction of a new railway line to the town.

Construction of the main college building began in the fall of 1885 upon a plan designed by W.A. Ritchie, with the 4-story building anticipated to be ready for occupancy September 1, 1886, in time for the 1886–87 academic year. Dormitory cottages were also to be built. Total cost of construction was projected at $60,000. Upon completion the building was touted in the local press as "one of the finest buildings in the state."

=== Launch ===
In April 1886, Dr. John E. Earp, formerly head of Indiana Asbury University, a Methodist-affiliated college in Greencastle, Indiana, was tapped by the board of trustees as the first President of the Southwest Kansas Conference College.

Southwest Kansas Conference College graduated its first class of 3 students on June 3, 1889.

=== Name change ===
In 1909 the name of Southwest Kansas Conference College was changed to Southwestern College.

== Academics ==
The main campus is a laptop learning community, with laptop computers provided to all incoming students. An emphasis on service learning has led to nationally recognized programs in leadership, discipleship, and sustainability (green issues). In addition to bachelor's degrees, several master's programs give undergraduate students the option of completing a graduate degree. Its doctoral degree in education started during the summer of 2012.

Southwestern College's professional studies programs focus on degree completion for working adults. Six professional studies sites in three states allow students to earn their bachelor's degrees and selected master's programs in either a traditional classroom setting or online. The ground locations are in Wichita, McConnell AFB, Fort Riley, Kansas and Midwest City, Oklahoma.

The school owns and operates radio station KSWC-LP.

=== Accreditation ===
Southwestern College is accredited by the Higher Learning Commission. It is further approved by the University Senate of the United Methodist Church and other accrediting bodies for individual majors.

== "The Mound" ==
The college's nickname, "Moundbuilders," (frequently shortened to just "Builders") has inspired the creation of a large pile of rocks on the college campus, called "The Mound." At the beginning of each school year, the "Moundbuilding Ceremony" allows students, faculty, alum, clubs, and guests of Southwestern College to place a rock on the Mound. Participants are invited to decorate their rocks with paint, and some are decorated quite creatively.

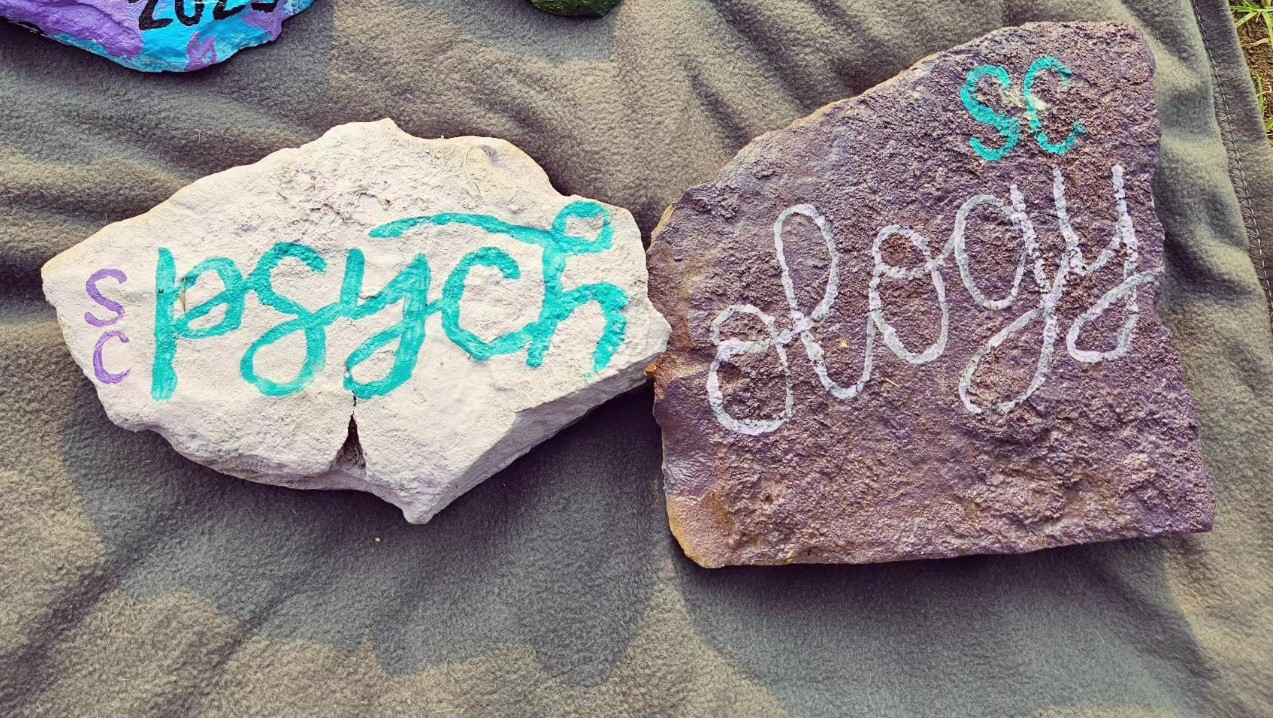
Example of hand painted Moundbuilding Rocks for Psychology Club at SC in 2023

Although rocks are never removed from the Mound, the Mound itself was moved from the upper campus to the lower campus in the 1970s when Darbeth Fine Arts Building was built on the original site of the Mound. A major renovation in 2006 added a plaza area around the Mound with commemorative stones, benches, and landscaping.

The nickname Moundbuilders originated in 1910 when students wanted to be called something other than "Preachers" or "Methodists." Editorialists toyed with various suggestions based on the fact that Southwestern students lived on "the hill." The name "Cliff-dwellers" was suggested but was ultimately scrapped for "Moundbuilders" after student Harry Hart wrote that "anybody could just dwell there, but 'builders' shows action." The Moundbuilding ceremony was instituted in 1927 by Dean Leroy Allen who said, "Nobody but Moundbuilders can build mounds. So no other college has now, or ever is likely to have such a custom."

=== The Order of the Mound ===
The Order of the Mound is the official Honor Society for Southwestern College graduates. Although the society was formally organized in 1917, membership in the Order of the Mound includes graduates from 1889 onward. In 1927, a process was established to induct qualified graduates from years prior to 1917.

Currently, to qualify for induction, students must be in the top 10% of all graduates who have completed at least 60 graded hours or more at Southwestern College.

== Athletics ==
The Southwestern athletic teams are called the Moundbuilders. The college is a member of the National Association of Intercollegiate Athletics (NAIA), primarily competing in the Kansas Collegiate Athletic Conference (KCAC) since the 1958–59 academic year; which they were a member on a previous stint from 1902–03 to 1922–23. The Moundbuilders previously competed in the Central Intercollegiate Athletic Conference (CIC) from 1923–24 to 1957–58.

Southwestern competes in 19 intercollegiate sports. Men's sports include baseball, basketball, cross country, football, golf, soccer, tennis and track & field. Women's sports include basketball, cross country, golf, soccer, softball, tennis, track & field, volleyball and, as of 2023, flag-football; and co-ed sports include cheerleading and dance.

=== Accomplishments ===
The men's track team has won 30 consecutive conference championships, while the women have won 16 straight. The men's cross country has won 30 consecutive conference championships, while the women have won 4 straight and 11 of the last 14, with the school garnering 134 conference championships in nine different sports since 1960. The track teams are coached by Jim Helmer and Mike Kirkland. The school has had over 160 All-American scholar-athletes since 1980.

Southwestern College football players have gone on to successful coaching careers, including Jerry Kill, a former head football coach at the University of Minnesota.

== Notable alumni ==
- Joe Cobb - mayor of Roanoke, Virginia
- Neil Frank - former director, National Hurricane Center, television weatherman
- Tex Gibbons - former captain of gold medal-winning American basketball team at the 1936 Summer Olympics.
- Steven Hatfill - American physician, virologist and biological weapons expert.
- C. Darnell Jones II - judge, U.S. District Court for the Eastern District of Pennsylvania and Pennsylvania's First Judicial District
- Jerry Kill - offensive coordinator, former head coach, former college football player.
- Brad Long - former basketball player at Southwestern, starred as basketball team captain in sports film Hoosiers.
- Gordon Young - organist and composer of organ and choral works.
