= List of Fort Hays State Tigers head football coaches =

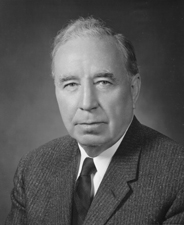
An "Honorable Mention" All-American player for the Nebraska Cornhuskers, Andrew Frank Schoeppel was head football coach at Fort Hays State for the 1929 season, garnering a record of 2–5. He later became the 29th Governor of Kansas.

The Fort Hays State Tigers football program is a college football team that represents Fort Hays State University in the Mid-America Intercollegiate Athletics Association, a part of NCAA Division II. The team has had 23 head coaches since its first recorded football game in 1902. After it was announced that head coach Kevin Verdugo would not return for the 2011 season, Chris Brown was announced as the new head coach.

The coach with the most wins for the team was Bob Cortese with 55, and James J. Yeager had the highest winning percentage at .800 in 1935. Wayne J. McConnell coached the most games for the school, 155 games total from 1956 through 1968. One year coach Andrew Frank Schoeppel went on to become the 29th governor of Kansas from 1943 to 1947 and a U.S. senator from 1949 until his death. Jim Gilstrap went on to a successful coaching career in the Canadian Football League.

== Key ==
Key to symbols in coaches list
General		Overall		Conference		Postseason (Note: Although the first Rose Bowl Game was played in 1902, it has been continuously played since the 1916 game, and is recognized as the oldest bowl game by the NCAA. "—" indicates any season prior to 1916 when postseason games were not played.)	
No.	Order of coaches (Note: A running total of the number of head coaches, with coaches who served separate tenures being counted only once. Interim head coaches are represented with "Int" and are not counted in the running total. "—" indicates the team played but either without a coach or no coach is on record. "X" indicates an interim year without play.)	GC	Games coached	CW	Conference wins	PW	Postseason wins
DC	Division championships	OW	Overall wins	CL	Conference losses	PL	Postseason losses
CC	Conference championships	OL	Overall losses	CT	Conference ties	PT	Postseason ties
NC	National championships	OT	Overall ties (Note: Overtime rules in college football were introduced in 1996, making ties impossible in the period since.)	C%	Conference winning percentage		
†	Elected to the College Football Hall of Fame	O%	Overall winning percentage (Note: When computing the win–loss percentage, a tie counts as half a win and half a loss.)				

== Coaches ==
Statistics correct as of the end of the 2025 season.

No.	Name	Term	GC	OW	OL	OT	O%	CW	CL	CT	C%	PW	PL	CCs	Awards
0	No coach	1902–1912	28	11	10	7	.518	—	—	—	—	—	—	—	—
1	Ira Van Cleave	1913–1914	13	9	4	0	.692	—	—	—	—	—	—	—	—
2	W. G. Speer	1915–1918	24	18	6	0	.750	—	—	—	—	—	—	1	—
3	Alfred J. Robertson	1919	9	3	6	0	.333	3	4	0	.429	—	—	—	—
4	Ralph Archer	1920	8	2	5	1	.313	2	3	1	.417	—	—	—	—
5	George Woodward	1920–1922	22	10	10	2	.500	10	7	2	.579	—	—	1	—
6	William D. Weidein	1923–1928	49	19	24	6	.449	14	22	4	.400	—	—	—	—
7	Andrew Frank Schoeppel	1929	7	2	5	0	.286	2	4	0	.333	—	—	—	—
8	W. C. Riley	1930–1934	46	21	19	6	.522	11	14	1	.442	—	—	1	—
9	James J. Yeager	1935	10	8	2	0	.800	3	1	0	.750	—	—	1	—
10	Paul D. Waldorf	1936–1941	54	25	21	8	.537	11	13	1	.460	—	—	1	—
11	Bill Bearly	1942	9	1	8	0	.111	0	5	0	.000	—	—	—	—
12	Ralph Huffman	1946–1955	88	41	37	10	.523	20	20	10	.500	—	—	1	—
13	Wayne J. McConnell	1956–1968	115	45	67	3	.404	20	36	2	.362	—	—	1	—
14	Tom Stromgren	1969–1971	29	7	21	1	.259	3	12	1	.219	—	—	—	—
15	Bill Giles	1972–1978	71	24	44	3	.359	16	23	2	.415	—	—	1	—
16	Bobby Thompson	1979–1980, 1984	31	9	20	2	.323	6	13	2	.333	—	—	—	—
17	Jim Gilstrap	1981–1983	32	20	11	1	.641	11	9	1	.548	—	—	—	—
18	John Vincent	1985–1989	50	22	26	2	.460	16	15	0	.516	—	—	—	—
19	Bob Cortese	1990–1997	90	55	32	3	.628	35	12	2	.735	1	3	2	—
20	Jeff Leiker	1998–2000	32	13	19	0	.406	9	15	0	.375	—	—	—	—
21	Tim O'Connor	2001–2004	44	20	24	0	.455	15	17	0	.469	—	—	—	—
22	Kevin Verdugo	2005–2010	64	18	47	0	.277	11	42	0	.208	—	—	—	—
23	Chris Brown	2011–present	158	96	63	0	.601	86	58	0	.597	1	3	2	—

== See also ==
- List of lists of people from Kansas
