= List of Fort Hays State Tigers football seasons =

This is a list of Fort Hays State Tigers football season records. The Fort Hays State Tigers football team is the football team of Fort Hays State University, located in the American city of Hays, Kansas. The team competes as a Mid-America Intercollegiate Athletics Association (MIAA) at the NCAA Division II level.

Since the program's beginning in 1902, they have been known as the West Normals, the Normal Tigers, and the Tigers. Since 1936, Fort Hays State's football team has played in Lewis Field Stadium, named after William Alexander Lewis, president of Fort Hays State University from 1913 to 1933.

Fort Hays has won 12 conference championships: two in the Kansas Conference, five in the Central Intercollegiate Athletic Conference, one in the Central States Intercollegiate Conference, two in the Rocky Mountain Athletic Conference, and two in the Mid-America Intercollegiate Athletics Association.

Year	Coach	Overall	Conference	Standing	Bowl/playoffs	Coaches^{#}	AP^{°}
Unknown coach (None) (1902–1907)
1902	Unknown	1–0–3					
1903	Unknown	2–1–0					
1904	Unknown	3–3–0					
1905	Unknown	3–2–1					
1906	Unknown	2–1–1					
1907	Unknown	1–2–1					
Claude Bice (none) (1908–1909)
1908	Claude Bice	3–1–1					
1909	Claude Bice	1–2–1					
No team (none) (1910–1911)
Ira Van Cleave (none) (1912–1914)
1912	Ira Van Cleave	1–1–0					
1913	Ira Van Cleave	4–2–0					
1914	Ira Van Cleave	5–2–0					
W. G. Speer (Kansas Intercollegiate Athletic Conference) (1915–1918)
1915	W. G. Speer	4–3–0	3–3–0	6th			
1916	W. G. Speer	5–2–0	4–1–0	2nd			
1917	W. G. Speer	7–0–0	6–0–0	1st			
1918	W. G. Speer	2–1–0					
A.J. Robertson (Kansas Conference) (1919)
1919	A.J. Robertson	3–6–0	3–4	T–7th			
George Woodward (Kansas Conference) (1920–1922)
1920	George Woodward	2–5–1	2–3–1	T–9th			
1921	George Woodward	6–1–0	6–0	1st			
1922	George Woodward	2–4–1	2–4–1	12th			
Bill Weidlein (Kansas Conference) (1923–1928)
1923	Bill Weidlein	4–3–2	3–3–2	8th			
1924	Bill Weidlein	4–4–0	3–4–0	10th			
1925	Bill Weidlein	2–4–1	1–4–1	12th			
1926	Bill Weidlein	3–5–0	2–5–0	T–12th			
1927	Bill Weidlein	2–5–1	2–4–1	11th			
Central Intercollegiate Athletic Conference
1928	Bill Weidlein	3–3–2	3–3–1	T–5th			
Andrew Schoeppel (Central Intercollegiate Athletic Conference) (1929)
1929	Andrew Schoeppel	2–5–0	2–5–0	T–5th			
Jack Riley (Central Intercollegiate) (1922–1928)
1930	Jack Riley	2–5–2	1–4–1	T–5th			
1931	Jack Riley	3–5–1	1–4–1	6th			
1932	Jack Riley	4–5–0	2–4–0	T–4th			
1933	Jack Riley	6–2–2	3–1–2	2nd			
1934	Jack Riley	6–2–1	4–1–0	1st			
Jim Yeager (Central Intercollegiate) (1935)
1935	Jim Yeager	8–2–1	3–1–0	T–1st			
Paul Waldorf (Central Intercollegiate) (1936–1941)
1936	Paul Waldorf	6–3–0	4–0–0	1st			
1937	Paul Waldorf	6–2–1	2–2–0	3rd			
1938	Paul Waldorf	7–2–0	3–1–0	2nd			
1939	Paul Waldorf	2–5–2	1–3–1	5th			
1940	Paul Waldorf	3–3–3	1–3–0	T–4th			
1941	Paul Waldorf	1–6–2	0–5–0	6th			
Bill Bearley (Central Intercollegiate) (1942)
1942	Bill Bearley	1–8–0	0–5–0	6th			
No team (WWII) (1943–1945)
Ralph Huffman (Central Intercollegiate) (1946–1955)
1946	Ralph Huffman	2–4–2	1–2–2	T–4th			
1947	Ralph Huffman	5–3–1	2–2–1	T–4th			
1948	Ralph Huffman	5–3–1	3–1–1	2nd			
1949	Ralph Huffman	5–4–0	3–2–0	T–3rd			
1950	Ralph Huffman	3–4–2	0–3–2	T–5th			
1951	Ralph Huffman	5–4–0	2–3–0	T–4th			
1952	Ralph Huffman	1–6–2	0–3–2	T–5th			
1953	Ralph Huffman	3–4–1	2–2–1	T–3rd			
1954	Ralph Huffman	7–2–0	4–1–0	T–3rd			
1955	Ralph Huffman	5–3–1	2–2–1	T–1st			
Wayne McConnell (Central Intercollegiate) (1956–1968)
1956	Wayne McConnell	1–8–0	0–5–0	6th			
1957	Wayne McConnell	4–4–0	2–2–0	3rd			
1958	Wayne McConnell	4–4–1	2–2–1	T–3rd			
1959	Wayne McConnell	3–6–0	1–4–0	T–5th			
1960	Wayne McConnell	2–7–0	1–4–0	T–5th			
1961	Wayne McConnell	0–9–0	0–5–0	6th			
1962	Wayne McConnell	6–2–1	3–1–1	2nd			
1963	Wayne McConnell	2–6–1	1–3–0	4th			
1964	Wayne McConnell	5–4–0	2–2–0	T–2nd			
1965	Wayne McConnell	6–3–0	3–1–0	2nd			
1966	Wayne McConnell	7–2–0	3–1–0	T–1st			
1967	Wayne McConnell	3–5–0	2–2–0	3rd			
1968	Wayne McConnell	2–7–0	0–4–0	5th			
Tom Stromgren (Rocky Mountain Athletic Conference) (1969–1971)
1969	Tom Stromgren	0–9–0	0–6–0	6th			
1970	Tom Stromgren	5–5–0	2–3–0	4th			
1971	Tom Stromgren	2–7–1	1–3–1	T–4th			
Bill Giles (Great Plains Athletic Conference) (1972–1978)
1972	Bill Giles	1–8–1	1–5–0	T–6th			
1973	Bill Giles	5–4–0	2–3–0	T–3rd			
1974	Bill Giles	1–9–0	1–4–0	T–4th			
1975	Bill Giles	3–7–0	2–3–0	T–4th			
Central States Intercollegiate Conference
1976	Bill Giles	5–4–0	5–1–0	T–1st			
1977	Bill Giles	3–7–1	1–5–1	T–7th			
1978	Bill Giles	6–5–1	4–2–1	3rd			
Bobby Thompson (Central States Intercollegiate) (1979–1980)
1979	Bobby Thompson	5–6–0	3–4–0	T–3rd			
1980	Bobby Thompson	4–4–2	3–2–2	T–3rd			
Jim Gilstrap (Central States Intercollegiate) (1981–1983)
1981	Jim Gilstrap	6–5–0	3–4–0	T–5th			
1982	Jim Gilstrap	6–3–1	4–2–1	4th			
1983	Jim Gilstrap	8–3–0	4–3–0	T–3rd			
Bobby Thompson (Central States Intercollegiate) (1984)
1984	Bobby Thompson	0–10–0	0–7–0	8th			
John Vincent (Central States Intercollegiate) (1985–1989)
1985	John Vincent	7–2–1	5–2–0	2nd			
1986	John Vincent	4–6–0	2–5–0	T–5th			
1987	John Vincent	5–5–0	4–3–0	4th			
1988	John Vincent	3–6–1	3–4–0	4th			
Rocky Mountain Athletic Conference
1989	John Vincent	3–7–0					
Bob Cortese (Rocky Mountain Athletic Conference) (1990–1997)
1990	Bob Cortese	8–4–0					
1991	Bob Cortese	8–3–0	4–2–0	2nd			
1992	Bob Cortese	6–5–0	6–1–0	2nd			
1993	Bob Cortese	8–4–0	6–1–0	1st			
1994	Bob Cortese	5–5–1	5–5–1	2nd			
1995	Bob Cortese	8–2–2	6–0–1	T–1st	L NCAA Division II Championship		
1996	Bob Cortese	7–3	5–3	T–3rd			
1997	Bob Cortese	5–6	4–4	5th			
Jeff Leiker (Rocky Mountain Athletic Conference) (1998–2000)
1998	Jeff Leiker	6–5	4–4	5th			
1999	Jeff Leiker	2–9	2–6	T–7th			
2000	Jeff Leiker	5–5	3–5	5th			
Tim O'Connor (Rocky Mountain Athletic Conference) (2001–2004)
2001	Tim O'Connor	3–8	2–6	7th			
2002	Tim O'Connor	5–6	3–5	7th			
2003	Tim O'Connor	6–5	5–3	3rd			
2004	Tim O'Connor	6–5	5–3	4th			
Kevin Verdugo (Rocky Mountain Athletic Conference) (2005–2010)
2005	Kevin Verdugo	2–8	2–6	T–7th			
Mid-America Intercollegiate Athletics Association
2006	Kevin Verdugo	1–10	1–8	T–9th			
2007	Kevin Verdugo	4–7	2–7	8th			
2008	Kevin Verdugo	2–9	1–8	10th			
2009	Kevin Verdugo	6–5	4–5	6th			
2010	Kevin Verdugo	3–8	1–8	10th			
Chris Brown (Mid-America Intercollegiate Athletics Association) (2011–present)
2011	Chris Brown	4–7	3–6	T–6			
2012	Chris Brown	5–6	3–6	T–9th			
2013	Chris Brown	6–5	4–5	8th			
2014	Chris Brown	7–4	7–4	T–4th			
2015	Chris Brown	8–4	8–3	T–3rd	L Mineral Water Bowl		
2016	Chris Brown	7–4	7–4	T–4th	Heart of Texas Bowl		
2017	Chris Brown	11–1	11–0	1st	L NCAA Second Round		
2018	Chris Brown	9–3	9–2	1st	L NCAA First Round		
2019	Chris Brown	8–3	8–3	T–3rd			
2021	Chris Brown	5–6	5–6	7th			
2022	Chris Brown	3–8	3–8	10th			
2023	Chris Brown	7–4	6–4	T–5th			
2024	Chris Brown	8–3	6–3	T–3rd			
2025	Chris Brown	6–5	5–4	T–5th			
Total:		501–529–55					
National championship Conference title Conference division title or championship game berth
^{#}Rankings from final Coaches Poll.
