= Sponaugle =

Sponaugle is a surname.

== List of people with the surname ==
- Isaac Sponaugle (born 1979), American politician
- S. Woodrow Sponaugle (1915–1967), American football and basketball coach

== See also ==
- Sponaugle–Williamson Field
