= 1946 Central Intercollegiate Conference football season =

- Sport: Football
- Number of teams: 6
- Champion: Southwestern

Football seasons
- ← 1945 1947 →

1946 Central Intercollegiate Conference football standings
	Conf.					Overall
Team	W		L		T	W		L		T
Southwestern (KS) $	4	–	1	–	0	8	–	2	–	0
Washburn	3	–	1	–	1	6	–	2	–	1
St. Benedict's	2	–	2	–	1	4	–	3	–	1
Pittsburg State	1	–	2	–	2	4	–	2	–	3
Fort Hays State	1	–	2	–	2	2	–	4	–	2
Emporia State	1	–	4	–	0	4	–	5	–	0
$ – Conference champion

The 1946 Central Intercollegiate Conference football season was the season of college football played by the six member schools of the Central Intercollegiate Conference (CIC) as part of the 1946 college football season. The Southwestern Moundbuilders compiled an 8–2 record and won the CIC championship. None of the CIC teams was ranked in the Associated Press poll or played in a bowl game.

== Conference overview ==
Conf. rank	Team	Head coach	Conf. record	Overall record	Points scored	Points against
1	Southwestern (KS)	Art Kahler	4–1	8–2	142	76
2	Washburn	Dick Godlove	3–1–1	6–2–1	138	86
3	St. Benedict's	Marty Peters	2–2–1	4–3–1	107	99
4 (tied)	Pittsburg State	Charles Morgan	1–2–2	2–4–2	72	46
4 (tie)	Fort Hays State	Ralph Huffman	1–2–2	2–4–2	80	102
5 (tie)	Emporia State	Fran Welch	1–4	4–5	171	163

== Teams ==
=== Southwestern ===
1946 Southwestern Moundbuilders football

CIC champion
- Conference: Central Intercollegiate Conference
- Record: 8–2 (4–1 CIC)
- Head coach: Art Kahler (1st season)

The 1946 Southwestern Moundbuilders football team was an American football team that represented Southwestern College as a member of the Central Intercollegiate Conference (CIC) during the 1946 college football season. In their first season under head coach Art Kahler, the team compiled an 8–2 record (4–1 against CIC opponents) and won the CIC championship.

Date	Opponent	Site	Result	Source
September 27	at Baker*	Baldwin City, KS	W 25–0	
October 4	Fort Hays State	Southwestern College Field; Winfield, KS	W 12–0	
October 11	at Southwestern Tech*	Weatherford, OK	W 33–0	
October 18	Central State (OK)*	Southwestern College Field; Winfield, KS	W 13–0	
October 25	at Pittsburg State	Pittsburg, KS	L 6–7	
November 2	Bethel (KS)*		L 0–6	
November 9	at St. Benedict's	Atchison, KS	W 7–4	
November 16	Washburn	Southwestern College Field; Winfield, KS	W 14–0	
November 23	at College of Emporia*	Emporia, KS	W 19–6	
November 28	Emporia State	Southwestern College Field; Winfield, KS	W 33–20	
*Non-conference game

=== Washburn ===
1946 Washburn Ichabods football
- Conference: Central Intercollegiate Conference
- Record: 6–2–1 (3–1–1 CIC)
- Head coach: Dick Godlove (1st season)

The 1946 Washburn Ichabods football team was an American football team that represented Washburn University of Topeka, Kansas, as a member of the Central Intercollegiate Conference (CIC) during the 1946 college football season. In their first season under head coach Dick Godlove, the team compiled an 6–2–1 record (3–1–1 against CIC opponents) and finished in second place in the CIC.

Date	Opponent	Site	Result	Attendance	Source
September 20	Hastings*	Topeka, KS	W 25–0		
September 28	at Augustana (SD)*	Sioux Falls, SD	W 7–0	3,000	
October 4	Emporia State	Topeka, KS	W 20–12		
October 11	Iowa Wesleyan*	Topeka, KS	W 27–6		
October 18	at Pittsburg State	Pittsburg, KS	W 12–7		
October 25	St. Benedict's^{†}	Moore Bowl; Topeka, KS	W 27–6	8,000	
November 2	Wichita*	Yager Stadium; Topeka, KS	L 0–21		
November 9	at Fort Hays State	Hays, KS	T 20–20		
November 16	at Southwestern (KS)	Southwestern College Field; Winfield, KS	L 0–14		
*Non-conference game; ^{†}Homecoming

=== St. Benedict's ===
1946 St. Benedict's Ravens football
- Conference: Central Intercollegiate Conference
- Record: 4–3–1 (2–2–1 CIC)
- Head coach: Marty Peters (6th season)

The 1946 St. Benedict's Ravens football team was an American football team that represented St. Benedict's College (later renamed Benedictine College) of Atchison, Kansas, as a member of the Central Intercollegiate Conference (CIC) during the 1946 college football season. In their sixth season under head coach Marty Peters, the team compiled a 4–3–1 record (2–2–1 against CIC opponents), finished in third place in the CIC, and outscored opponents by a total of 107 to 99.

In the fall of 1946, St. Benedict's had the largest enrollment in its then 87-year history, with enrollment estimated at 425 students, an increase of over 100% over the prior year.

Date	Opponent	Site	Result	Attendance	Source
September 28	Missouri "B"*	Central High School Stadium	L 6–30	2,600	
October 5	College of Emporia*	Atchison, KS	W 18–0		
October 12	at Rockhurst*	Kansas City, MO	W 26–7		
October 19	at Fort Hays State	Lewis Stadium; Hays, KS	W 14–7		
October 25	at Washburn	Topeka, KS	L 6–27	8,000	
November 2	Pittsburg State	Amelia Earhart Stadium; Atchison, KS	T 7–7		
November 9	Southwestern (KS)^{†}	Atchison, KS	L 4–7		
November 16	at Emporia State	Emporia, KS	W 26–14		
*Non-conference game; ^{†}Homecoming

=== Pittsburg State ===
1946 Pittsburg State Gorillas football
- Conference: Central Intercollegiate Conference
- Record: 2–4–2 (1–2–2 CIC)
- Head coach: Charles Morgan (10th season)

The 1946 Pittsburg State Gorillas football team was an American football team that represented Kansas State Teachers College of Pittsburg—now known as Pittsburg State University—as a member of the Central Intercollegiate Conference (CIC) during the 1946 college football season. In their tenth season under head coach Charles Morgan, the team compiled a 2–4–2 record (1–2–2 against CIC opponents), tied for fourth place in the CIC, and outscored opponents by a total of 72 to 46.

Date	Opponent	Site	Result	Source
September 28	Central Missouri State*	Pittsburg, KS	W 12–0	
October 4	at Southwest Missouri State*	SMS Stadium; Springfield, MO	W 14–0	
October 11	at Fort Hays State	Hays, KS	T 0–0	
October 18	Washburn	Pittsburg, KS	L 7–12	
October 25	Southwestern (KS)	Pittsburg, KS	W 7–6	
November 2	at St. Benedict's	Amelia Earhart Stadium; Atchison, KS	T 7–7	
November 9	at Missouri Mines*	Rolla, MO	T 0–0	
November 15	Rockhurst*	Pittsburg, KS	W 25–0	
	Emporia State		L 0–21	
*Non-conference game

=== Fort Hays State ===
1946 Fort Hays State Tigers football
- Conference: Central Intercollegiate Conference
- Record: 2–4–2 (1–2–2 CIC)
- Head coach: Ralph Huffman (1st season)
- Home stadium: Lewis Stadium

The 1946 Fort Hays State Tigers football team was an American football team that represented Fort Hays State University of Hays, Kansas, as a member of the Central Intercollegiate Conference (CIC) during the 1946 college football season. In their first season under head coach Ralph Huffman, the team compiled a 2–4–2 record (1–2–2 against CIC opponents), tied for fourth place in the CIC, and was outscored by a total of 102 to 80.

Date	Opponent	Site	Result	Attendance	Source
September 21	Kansas Wesleyan*	Lewis Stadium; Hays, KS	W 14–0		
September 28	Colorado College*	Washburn Field; Colorado Springs, CO	L 0–15	4,000	
October 4	at Southwestern (KS)	Southwestern College Field; Winfield, KS	L 0–12		
October 11	Pittsburg State	Hays, KS	T 0–0		
October 19	St. Benedict's	Lewis Stadium; Hays, KS	L 7–14		
October 26	Emporia State^{†}	Emporia, KS	W 25–6		
November 9	Washburn	Fort Hays, KS	T 20–20		
November 16	at Colorado Mines*	Golden, CO	L 14–35		
*Non-conference game; ^{†}Homecoming

=== Emporia State ===
1946 Emporia State Hornets football
- Conference: Central Intercollegiate Conference
- Record: 4–5 (1–4 CIC)
- Head coach: Fran Welch (16th season)

The 1946 Emporia State Hornets football team was an American football team that represented Emporia State University of Emporia, Kansas, as a member of the Central Intercollegiate Conference (CIC) during the 1946 college football season. In their 16th season under head coach Fran Welch, the team compiled a 4–5 record (1–4 against CIC opponents), placed last out of six teams in the CIC, and outscored opponents by a total of 72 to 46.

Date	Opponent	Site	Result	Source
October 4	at Washburn	Topeka, KS	L 12–20	
October 12	Colorado Mines*	Emporia, KS	W 26–6	
October 19	at Colorado State–Greeley*	Greeley, CO	L 21–41	
October 26	Fort Hays State	Emporia, KS	L 6–25	
November 1	at Rockhurst*	Kansas City, MO	W 38–12	
November 9	Dakota Wesleyan*	Emporia, KS	W 13–0	
November 16	St. Benedict's	Emporia, KS	L 14–26	
	Pittsburg State		W 21–0	
November 28	Southwestern (KS)	Southwestern College Field; Winfield, KS	L 20–33	
*Non-conference game
