= Thomas Hayden =

Thomas Hayden may refer to:

- Thomas Hayden (Irish politician) (fl. 1940s), Irish senator
- Thomas Hayden (weightlifter) (1926–2018), Irish weightlifter
- Thomas C. Hayden, American football coach
- Tom Hayden (1939–2016), American social and political activist, author and politician
- Tommy Hayden (born 1978), American motorcycle racer

== See also ==
- Thomas Haydon (disambiguation)
- Tom Hagen
