= Jan Vincent =

Jan Vincent may refer to:

- Jan-Michael Vincent (1944–2019), American actor
- Jan Vincent-Rostowski (born 1951), Polish-British economist and politician
- Jan Vincent-Rudzki (born 1955), British founding editor of the magazine TV Zone

== See also ==
- Jan Vincents Johannessen (born 1941), Norwegian physician and composer
- John Vincent (disambiguation)
