= 1946 Kansas Collegiate Athletic Conference football season =

- Sport: Football
- Teams: 7
- Champion: Bethany (KS)

Football seasons
- 1945 1947

1946 Kansas Collegiate Athletic Conference football standings
	Conf.					Overall
Team	W		L		T	W		L		T
Bethany (KS) $	5	–	1	–	0	6	–	2	–	0
Ottawa	4	–	1	–	1	7	–	1	–	1
Baker	4	–	1	–	1	5	–	3	–	1
McPherson	3	–	2	–	1	4	–	3	–	1
Kansas Wesleyan	2	–	3	–	1	3	–	4	–	2
Bethel (KS)	1	–	5	–	0	2	–	6	–	0
College of Emporia	0	–	6	–	0	1	–	8	–	0
$ – Conference champion

The 1946 Kansas Collegiate Athletic Conference football season was the season of college football played by the seven member schools of the Kansas Collegiate Athletic Conference (KCAC) as part of the 1946 college football season.

The Bethany Swedes compiled a 6–2 record and won the KCAC championship.

The Ottawa Braves finished in second place and led the conference in both scoring offense (25.9 points per game) and scoring defense (3.7 points per game).

None of the KCAC teams was ranked in the Associated Press poll or played in a bowl game.

== Conference overview ==
Conf. rank	Team	Head coach	Conf. record	Overall record	Points scored	Points against
1	Bethany (KS)	Ray D. Hahn	5–1	6–2	130	131
2 (tie)	Ottawa	Wally A. Forsberg	4–1–1	7–1–1	233	33
2 (tie)	Baker	Karl Spear	4–1–1	5–3–1	154	71
4	McPherson	Thomas C. Hayden	3–2–1	4–3–1	107	114
5	Kansas Wesleyan	Virgil Baer	2–3–1	3–4–2	54	72
6	Bethel (KS)	Bob Tully	1–5	2–6	51	113
7	College of Emporia	Walt Newland	0–6	1–8	38	195

== Teams ==
=== Bethany ===
1946 Bethany Swedes football

KCAC champion
- Conference: Kansas Collegiate Athletic Conference
- Record: 6–2 (5–1 KCAC)
- Head coach: Ray D. Hahn (6th season)
- Home stadium: Bethany Field

The 1946 Bethany Swedes football team was an American football team that represented Bethany College as a member of the Kansas Collegiate Athletic Conference (KCAC) during the 1946 college football season. In their sixth, non-consecutive season under head coach Ray D. Hahn, the team compiled a 6–2 record (5–1 against KCAC opponents) and won the KCAC championship.

The team played its home games at Bethany Field in Lindsborg, Kansas.

Date	Opponent	Site	Result	Source
September 20	at Midland*	Fremont, NE	W 13–4	
October 3	Kansas Wesleyan	Bethany Field; Lindsborg, KS	W 14–13	
October 11	at Baker	Baldwin City, KS	L 0–26	
October 18	Bethel (KS)	Bethany Field; Lindsborg, KS	W 31–0	
October 26	at College of Emporia	Emporia, KS	W 25–0	
November 1	Ottawa^{†}	Bethany Field; Lindsborg, KS	W 20–14	
November 8	at McPherson	McPherson, KS	W 20–13	
November 23	at Oklahoma City*	Taft Stadium; Oklahoma City, OK	L 6–61	
*Non-conference game; ^{†}Homecoming

=== Ottawa ===
1946 Ottawa Braves football
- Conference: Kansas Collegiate Athletic Conference
- Record: 7–1–1 (4–1–1 KCAC)
- Head coach: Wally A. Forsberg (1st season)

The 1946 Ottawa Braves football team was an American football team that represented Ottawa University in Ottawa, Kansas, as a member of the Kansas Collegiate Athletic Conference (KCAC) during the 1946 college football season. Led by head coach first-year Wally A. Forsberg, the team compiled a 7–1–1 record (4–1–1 against KCAC opponents), tied for second place in the KCAC, shut out seven of nine opponents, and outscored all opponents by a total of 233 to 33.

Date	Opponent	Site	Result	Source
September 21	at Haskell*	Lawrence, KS	W 45–0	
September 27	Bethel (KS)	Ottawa, KS	W 33–0	
October 4	at William Jewell*	Liberty, MO	W 27–0	
October 11	Kansas Wesleyan	Salina, KS	T 0–0	
October 18	at Tarkio*	Tarkio, MO	W 37–0	
October 25	McPherson	Ottawa, KS	W 37–0	
November 1	at Bethany (KS)	Bethany Field; Lindsborg, KS	L 14–20	
November 15	at College of Emporia	Emporia, KS	W 20–0	
November 22	Baker^{†}	Ottawa, KS	W 20–13	
*Non-conference game; ^{†}Homecoming

=== Baker ===
1946 Baker Wildcats football
- Conference: Kansas Collegiate Athletic Conference
- Record: 5–3–1 (4–1–1 KCAC)
- Head coach: Karl Spear (1st season)

The 1946 Baker Wildcats football team was an American football team that represented Baker University in Baldwin City, Kansas, as a member of the Kansas Collegiate Athletic Conference (KCAC) during the 1946 college football season. Led by first-year head coach Karl Spear, the team compiled a 5–3–1 record (4–1–1 against KCAC opponents), tied for second place in the KCAC, and outscored opponents by a total of 154 to 71.

Date	Opponent	Site	Result	Source
September 27	Southwestern (KS)	Baldwin City, KS	L 0–25	
October 4	at McPherson	McPherson, KS	T 12–12	
October 11	Bethany (KS)	Baldwin City, KS	W 26–0	
October 18	College of Emporia	Baldwin City, KS	W 32–0	
October 25	at Bethel (KS)	Newton, KS	W 13–7	
	William Jewell		L 6–7	
November 8	Haskell	Baldwin City, KS	W 49–0	
November 16	Kansas Wesleyan	Baldwin City, KS	W 3–0	
November 22	at Ottawa	Ottawa, KS	L 13–20	

=== McPherson ===
1946 McPherson Bulldogs football
- Conference: Kansas Collegiate Athletic Conference
- Record: 4–3–1 (3–2–1 KCAC)
- Head coach: Thomas C. Hayden (4th season)

The 1946 McPherson Bulldogs football team was an American football team that represented McPherson College in McPherson, Kansas, as a member of the Kansas Collegiate Athletic Conference (KCAC) during the 1946 college football season. Led by fourth-year head coach Thomas C. Hayden, the team compiled a 4–3–1 record (3–2–1 against KCAC opponents), finished in fourth place in the KCAC, and was outscored by a total of 114 to 107.

Date	Opponent	Site	Result	Source
	Sterling*		W 13–7	
October 4	Baker	McPherson, KS	T 12–12	
October 11	at College of Emporia	Schaffner Field; Emporia, KS	W 28–0	
October 18	Kansas Wesleyan	McPherson, KS	W 28–0	
October 25	at Ottawa	Ottawa, KS	L 0–37	
November 2	Bethel		W 7–6	
November 8	Bethany	McPherson, KS	L 13–20	
November 15	at Missouri Valley*	Marshall, MO	L 6–32	
*Non-conference game

=== Kansas Wesleyan ===
1946 Kansas Wesleyan Coyotes football
- Conference: Kansas Collegiate Athletic Conference
- Record: 3–4–2 (2–3–1 KCAC)
- Head coach: Virgil Baer (1st season)

The 1946 Kansas Wesleyan Coyotes football team was an American football team that represented Kansas Wesleyan University in Salina, Kansas, as a member of the Kansas Collegiate Athletic Conference (KCAC) during the 1946 college football season. Led by first-year head coach Virgil Baer, the team compiled a 3–4–2 record (2–3–1 against KCAC opponents), finished in fifth place in the KCAC, and was outscored by a total of 72 to 54.

Date	Opponent	Site	Result	Source
September 21	at Fort Hays State	Lewis Stadium; Hays, KS	L 0–14	
September 27	Morningside	Salina, KS	W 9–7	
October 3	Bethany	Bethany Field; Lindsborg, KS	L 13–14	
October 11	Ottawa	Martin Stadium; Salina, KS	T 0–0	
October 18	at McPherson	McPherson Stadium; McPherson, KS	L 0–28	
October 26	Hamline		T 0–0	
November 2	College of Emporia^{†}	Salina, KS	W 26–6	
November 16	at Baker	Baldwin City, KS	L 0–3	
November 22	Bethel		W 6–0	
^{†}Homecoming

=== Bethel ===
1946 Bethel Graymaroons football
- Conference: Kansas Collegiate Athletic Conference
- Record: 2–6 (1–5 KCAC)
- Head coach: Bob Tully (1st season)

The 1946 Bethel Graymaroons football team was an American football team that represented Bethel College in North Newton, Kansas, as a member of the Kansas Collegiate Athletic Conference (KCAC) during the 1946 college football season. Led by first-year head coach Bob Tully, the team compiled a 2–6 record (1–5 against KCAC opponents), finished in sixth place in the KCAC, and was outscored by a total of 113 to 51.

Date	Opponent	Site	Result	Source
	Ottawa		L 0–33	
	NW Oklahoma Teachers*		L 6–14	
	Bethany		L 0–31	
	Baker		L 7–13	
	McPherson		L 6–7	
	College of Emporia		W 20–0	
	Sterling*		W 12–9	
	Kansas Wesleyan		L 0–6	
*Non-conference game

=== College of Emporia ===
1946 College of Emporia Fighting Presbies football
- Conference: Kansas Collegiate Athletic Conference
- Record: 1–8 (0–6 KCAC)
- Head coach: Walt Newland (1st season)
- Home stadium: Schaffner Field

The 1946 College of Emporia Fighting Presbies football team was an American football team that represented the College of Emporia in Emporia, Kansas, as a member of the Kansas Collegiate Athletic Conference (KCAC) during the 1946 college football season. Led by head coach Walt Newland, the team compiled a 1–8 record (0–6 against KCAC opponents), finished in last place in the KCAC, and was outscored by a total of 195 to 38.

Date	Time	Opponent	Site	Result	Source
September 27	8:00 p.m.	Haskell*	Schaffner Field; Emporia, KS	W 26–7	
October 5		at St. Benedict's*	Atchison, KS	L 0–18	
October 12		McPherson	Emporia, KS	L 0–28	
October 18		at Baker	Baldwin City, KS	L 0–32	
October 26		Bethany (KS)	Emporia, KS	L 0–25	
November 2		at Kansas Wesleyan	Salina, KS	L 6–26	
November 8		Bethel (KS)	Emporia, KS	L 0–20	
November 15		Ottawa (KS)	Emporia, KS	L 0–20	
November 23		Southwestern (KS)*	Emporia, KS	L 6–19	
*Non-conference game; All times are in Central time

== All-conference team ==
At the end of the season, the Associated Press (AP) selected a 1946 Kansas Conference all-star team. Ottawa, which finished second in the conference standings, placed four players on the first team. Conference champion Bethany placed three on the first team. The first-team picks by position were:

- Backs: Bill Olson, Bethany; Roy Carlson, Bethany; John Wassmer, Ottawa; Howard Knight, Baker
- Ends: Jim Irick, Baker; James Cahoon, Bethany
- Tackles: Warren Smith, Kansas Wesleyan; Buck Reinicker, McPherson
- Guards: Harry Trigg, Ottawa; Tom Trigg, Ottawa
- Center: Bill Erickson, Ottawa
