= Thomas Haydon =

Thomas Haydon may refer to:

- Thomas Haydon (tennis) in 1906 Wimbledon Championships – Men's Singles
- Tom Haydon, director of The Talgai Skull

== See also ==
- Thomas Hayden (disambiguation)
- Tom Hagen
