= John Vincent =

John Vincent may refer to:

== Politicians ==
- John Vincent (MP), member of parliament for Chichester and Midhurst
- John Carter Vincent (1900–1972), diplomat
- M. John Vincent, Indian politician from Tamil Nadu
- John Vincent (Kentucky politician), American politician from Kentucky
- John Vincent (Montana politician), American politician from Montana

== Sports ==
- John Vincent (American football), American college football coach
- Johnny Vincent (footballer) (1947–2006), English footballer

== Religion ==
- John Vincent (Carmelite) (1864-1943), Spanish priest, Venerable, born Juan Vicente Zengotitabengoa Lasuen
- John H. Vincent (1832–1920), American Methodist bishop and theologian
- John Ranulph Vincent, South African Anglican priest
- John Vincent (bishop of Damaraland) (1894–1960), bishop of Damaraland, 1952–1960
- St. John Vincent (died 1012), Catholic and Eastern Orthodox saint who was also a bishop and monk

== Music ==
- John Vincent (composer) (1902–1977), American composer
- Johnny Vincent (1927–2000), record producer

== Others ==
- John Vincent (British Army officer) (1764–1848), British general
- John Vincent (historian) (1937–2021), British historian
- John Vincent (lawyer), American lawyer, New York District Attorney in 1880s
- John Vincent (restaurateur) (born 1971), co-founder of Leon Restaurants
- John Vincent (sailor) (1879–1941), English seaman and member of Sir Ernest Shackleton's Imperial Trans-Antarctic Expedition
- John Painter Vincent (1776–1852), English surgeon

== See also ==
- Jean Vincent (1930–2013), footballer
- Jon Vincent (1962–2000), adult film actor
- Jack Vincent (1904–1999), English ornithologist
