= 1935 Little All-America college football team =

American college football all-star team

The 1935 Little All-America college football team is composed of college football players from small colleges and universities who were selected by the Associated Press (AP) as the best players at each position. For 1935, the AP did not select a second team but instead chose multiple players for "honorable mention" at each position.

== Selections ==
Position	Player	Team
QB	Will Roy	Loyola–New Orleans
HB	Johnny Oravec	Willamette
HB	Mickey Kobrosky	Trinity (CT)
FB	James Fraley	Kansas State Teachers
E	Robert Klien	Chattanooga
E	Red Ramsey	Texas Tech
T	Art Lewis	Ohio
T	Edwin Garland	Catawba
G	Virgil Baer	Kansas Wesleyan
G	John Butler	San Diego State
C	S. Woodrow Sponaugle	Franklin & Marshall

== See also ==
- 1935 College Football All-America Team
