= Art Kahler =

American football and basketball player and coach (1897–1982)

Biographical details
- Born: December 27, 1897; Arkansas City, Kansas, U.S.
- Died: April 23, 1982 (aged 84); Carlisle, Pennsylvania, U.S.

Playing career

Football
- 1918–1922: Southwestern (KS)
- Position: Tackle

Coaching career (HC unless noted)

Football
- 1928–1930: Sterling
- 1935–1941: Dickinson
- 1942: Lakehurst NAS (assistant)
- 1946–1947: Southwestern (KS)

Basketball
- 1931–1938: Brown
- 1947–1948: Southwestern (KS)

Track
- 1939–1941: Dickinson

Administrative career (AD unless noted)
- 1939–1942: Dickinson

Head coaching record
- Overall: 62–34–8 (football); 60–80 (basketball)

Accomplishments and honors

Championships
- Football; 1 CIC (1946)

Awards
- Kansas Sports Hall of Fame, 1974

Arthur Daniel Kahler Sr. (December 27, 1897 – April 23, 1982) was an American college football and basketball player and coach. He was listed in "Ripley's Believe It Or Not" as only person to coach at two different major colleges at the same time—head basketball coach at Brown University and football coach at Dickinson College in Carlisle, Pennsylvania. He later became a coach and athletic director at Southwestern College in Winfield, Kansas.

== Playing career ==
Kahler played football at Southwestern from 1918 until 1922. Walter Camp referred him as "a line of power" when he played Camp wrote high praises for his playing ability based on his senior year of 1922.

== Coaching career ==
=== Sterling ===
Kahler was the head football coach at Sterling College in Sterling, Kansas He held that position for three seasons, from 1928 to 1930, compiling a record of 19–5–2.=

=== Brown and Dickinson ===
Kahler coached men's basketball at Brown University from 1931 to 1938. At the same time, he was head football coach at Dickinson College, even though the schools are over 350 miles apart. Kahler coached his 100th football victory at Dickinson and also introduced night football to the school. He coached at Dickinson college from 1935 to 1941 and posted a record of 29–25–5.

=== Southwestern ===
Kahler was the 11th head football coachat Southwestern College in Winfield, Kansas, serving for two seasons, from 1946 to 1947, and compiling a record of 14–4–1.

Kahler also served as the men's basketball coach at Southwestern for the 1947–48, tallying a mark of 13–13. He also served as the athletic director of the school as well as coach of the track and field teams.

== Honors ==
Southwestern honored the memory of Kahler by naming the football field "Art Kahler Field."

In 1974, Kahler was inducted into the Kansas Sports Hall of Fame.

== Head coaching record ==
=== Football ===
Year	Team	Overall	Conference	Standing	Bowl/playoffs
Sterling Warriors (Kansas Collegiate Athletic Conference) (1928)
1928	Sterling	4–3–1	3–2–1	5th	
Sterling Warriors (Independent) (1929–1930)
1929	Sterling	7–1–1			
1930	Sterling	8–1			
Sterling:		19–5–2	3–2–1		
Dickinson Red Devils (Eastern Pennsylvania Collegiate Conference) (1935–1936)
1935	Dickinson	6–3	2–1	3rd	
1936	Dickinson	4–4–1	1–2–1	T–3rd	
Dickinson Red Devils (Independent) (1937–1941)
1937	Dickinson	7–0–1			
1938	Dickinson	3–4–1			
1939	Dickinson	4–5			
1940	Dickinson	3–4–1			
1941	Dickinson	2–5–1			
Dickinson:		29–25–5	3–3–1		
Southwestern Moundbuilders (Central Intercollegiate Conference) (1946–1947)
1946	Southwestern	8–2	4–1	1st	
1947	Southwestern	6–2–1	2–2–1	T–3rd	
Southwestern:		14–4–1	6–3–1		
Total:		60–34–8			
National championship Conference title Conference division title or championship game berth
