= Walt Newland =

American football coach

Coaching career (HC unless noted)
- 1946: College of Emporia

Head coaching record
- Overall: 1–8

Walt Newland was an American college football coach. He was the head football coach at the College of Emporia for the 1946 season. The school had ceased football competition at the conclusion of the 1942 season due to World War II. Newland completed the season with a record of 1–8.

== Head coaching record ==
Year	Team	Overall	Conference	Standing
College of Emporia Fighting Presbies (Kansas Collegiate Athletic Conference) (1946)
1946	College of Emporia	1–8	0–6	7th
College of Emporia:		1–8	0–6	
Total:		1–8		
