= 2000 Oklahoma Wranglers season =

American football season

- Owner: Ed Gatlin
- General manager: David Vance
- Head coach: Bob Cortese
- Home stadium: Myriad Convention Center

Results
- Record: 7–7
- Division place: 3rd
- Playoffs: Won Wild Card (at Sea Wolves) 52–38; Lost Quarterfinal (at SaberCats) 40–63

The 2000 Oklahoma Wranglers season is the sixth season for the franchise, and the first in Oklahoma City. The team played in the Arena Football League, and played the previous season in Portland, Oregon as the Portland Forest Dragons. The team was coached by Bob Cortese and played their home games at the Myriad Convention Center in Oklahoma City. The Wranglers finished third in the American Conference West Division with a 7–7 record earned the 10 seed for the AFL playoffs. They lost in the quarterfinals to the San Jose SaberCats.

== Schedule ==
=== Regular season ===
Week	Date	Opponent	Result	Record	Venue	Game recap
1	April 15	Buffalo Destroyers	W 62–51	1–0	Myriad Convention Center	Recap
2	April 21	San Jose SaberCats	W 68–64	2–0	Myriad Convention Center	Recap
3	May 1	at Los Angeles Avengers	W 59–33	3–0	Staples Center	Recap
4	May 5	Los Angeles Avengers	W 65–44	4–0	Myriad Convention Center	Recap
5	May 12	at San Jose SaberCats	L 30–37	4–1	San Jose Arena	Recap
6	May 19	at New England Sea Wolves	L 42–49	4–2	Hartford Civic Center	Recap
7	May 26	Orlando Predators	L 28–35	4–3	Myriad Convention Center	Recap
8	June 10	at New Jersey Red Dogs	L 40–56	4–4	Continental Airlines Arena	Recap
9	June 15	at Arizona Rattlers	L 28–42	4–5	America West Arena	Recap
10	June 24	Iowa Barnstormers	W 58–50	5–5	Myriad Convention Center	Recap
11	July 3	Arizona Rattlers	L 29–56	5–6	Myriad Convention Center	Recap
12	July 7	at Florida Bobcats	W 47–22	6–6	National Car Rental Center	Recap
13	July 15	at Milwaukee Mustangs	L 39–49	6–7	Bradley Center	Recap
14	July 20	Grand Rapids Rampage	W 59–17	7–7	Myriad Convention Center	Recap

=== Playoffs ===
Round	Date	Opponent (seed)	Result	Venue	Game recap
Wild Card	July 28	New England Sea Wolves (7)	W 52–38	Hartford Civic Center	Recap
Quarterfinals	August 4	vs. San Jose SaberCats (1)	L 20–31	San Jose Arena	Recap

== See also ==
- 2000 Arena Football League season
