= Bob Tully =

American football coach (1909–1981)

Biographical details
- Born: August 2, 1909; Goshen, Indiana, U.S.
- Died: June 12, 1981 (aged 71); Indianapolis, Indiana, U.S.

Playing career

Football
- 1927–1930: Manchester

Baseball
- 1928–1931: Manchester
- Positions: Quarterback (football); Catcher (baseball)

Coaching career (HC unless noted)

Football
- 1941: La Verne (assistant)
- 1946–1948: Bethel (KS)

Basketball
- 1940–1942: La Verne

Baseball
- c. 1941: La Verne

Administrative career (AD unless noted)
- 1940–?: La Verne
- 1946–1950: Bethel (KS)

Head coaching record
- Overall: 6–18–1 (football)

Robert Warren Tully (August 2, 1909 – June 12, 1981) was an American football, basketball, and baseball coach, college athletics administrator, parks and recreation director, and university professor. He was the head football coach at Bethel College in North Newton, Kansas, serving for three seasons, from 1946 to 1948, and compiling a record of 6–18–1.

Tully was born on August 2, 1909, in Goshen, Indiana. There he attended Goshen High School, playing football and basketball and running track. He played football and baseball each for four years at Manchester College—now known as Manchester University—in North Manchester, Indiana before graduating in 1931.

In July 1940, Tully was appointed the director of physical education and athletics at La Verne College—now known as the University of La Verne—in La Verne, California. He was also the head basketball and baseball coach at La Verne and assisted with the football team.

Tully took a leave of absence at Bethel College in 1950 to accept a graduate assistantship at Indiana University Bloomington. He remained at Indiana and was appointed director of the Bradford Woods Camping laboratory and associate professor of recreation and park administration. Tully retired from Indiana University in 1976 and later resided in Lorida, Florida. He died on June 12, 1981, at Indiana University Medical Center in Indianapolis.

== Head coaching record ==
=== Football ===
Year	Team	Overall	Conference	Standing	Bowl/playoffs
Bethel Graymaroons (Kansas Collegiate Athletic Conference) (1946–1948)
1946	Bethel	2–6	1–5	6th	
1947	Bethel	2–5–1	1–4–1	T–5th	
1948	Bethel	2–7	1–5	6th	
Bethel:		6–18–1	2–14–1		
Total:		6–18–1			
