= Charles Morgan (coach) =

American football and basketball coach

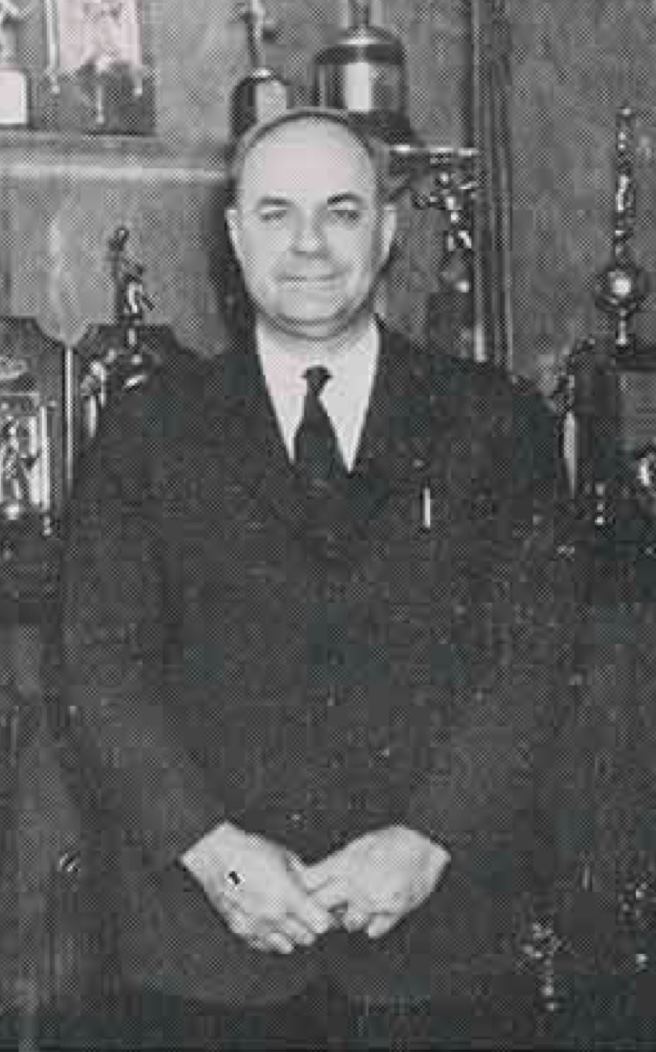
- Morgan from the 1946 Kanza

Biographical details
- Born: c. 1890; Kansas, U.S.

Coaching career (HC unless noted)

Football
- 1936: Pittsburg State
- 1938–1948: Pittsburg State

Basketball
- 1934–1935: Pittsburg State (interim HC)

Head coaching record
- Overall: 44–43–15 (football); 11–7 (basketball)

Accomplishments and honors

Championships
- Football; 2 CIC (1941–1942)

Charles H. Morgan was an American football and basketball coach. He served two stints as the head football coach at Kansas State Teachers College of Pittsburg—now known as Pittsburg State University— in Pittsburg, Kansas, in 1936 and again from 1938 to 1948, compiling a record of 44–43–15.

== Head coaching record ==
=== Football ===
Year	Team	Overall	Conference	Standing	Bowl/playoffs
Pittsburg State Gorillas (Central Intercollegiate Conference) (1936)
1936	Pittsburg State	3–5	3–1	2nd	
Pittsburg State Gorillas (Central Intercollegiate Conference) (1938–1948)
1938	Pittsburg State	4–4–2	2–2	3rd	
1939	Pittsburg State	3–4–2	2–1–2	T–2nd	
1940	Pittsburg State	3–7	1–3	T–3rd	
1941	Pittsburg State	5–2–3	3–1	1st	
1942	Pittsburg State	7–1	5–0	1st	
1943	Pittsburg State	6–0			
1944	Pittsburg State	3–3			
1945	Pittsburg State	2–2–2			
1946	Pittsburg State	4–2–3	1–2–2	T–4th	
1947	Pittsburg State	2–7–1	1–3–1	5th	
1948	Pittsburg State	2–6–2	1–4	5th	
Pittsburg State:		44–43–15	19–17–5		
Total:		44–43–15			
National championship Conference title Conference division title or championship game berth
