= 2001 Oklahoma Wranglers season =

American football season

- Owner: Ed Gatlin, then the AFL
- General manager: David Vance
- Head coach: Bob Cortese
- Home stadium: Myriad Convention Center

Results
- Record: 5–9
- Division place: 4th
- Playoffs: Did not qualify

The 2001 Oklahoma Wranglers season was the seventh and ultimately final season for the Arena Football League franchise, and the second in Oklahoma City. The team was coached by Bob Cortese and played their home games at the Myriad Convention Center in Oklahoma City. The Wranglers came off a 7–7 record from the previous season and a loss in the second round of the AFL playoffs. They finished the season with a 5–9 record.

== Schedule ==
=== Regular season ===
Week	Date	Opponent	Result	Record	Venue	Game recap
1	April 14	Houston Thunderbears	W 38–28	1–0	Myriad Convention Center	Recap
2	April 21	Chicago Rush	W 45–44	2–0	Myriad Convention Center	Recap
3	April 28	at Detroit Fury	L 42–50	2–1	The Palace at Auburn Hills	Recap
4	May 5	at San Jose SaberCats	L 17–73	2–2	San Jose Arena	Recap
5	May 12	Arizona Rattlers	L 42–50	2–3	Myriad Convention Center	Recap
6	May 19	at Toronto Phantoms	L 38–72	2–4	Air Canada Centre	Recap
7	May 26	at Los Angeles Avengers	L 33–36	2–5	Staples Center	Recap
8	June 2	Milwaukee Mustangs	W 52–38	3–5	Myriad Convention Center	Recap
9	June 9	at Arizona Rattlers	L 27–69	3–6	America West Arena	Recap
10	June 16	at Houston Thunderbears	W 78–52	4–6	City Bank Coliseum	Recap
11	June 24	San Jose SaberCats	L 41–60	4–7	Myriad Convention Center	Recap
12	June 30	Nashville Kats	L 47–73	4–8	Myriad Convention Center	Recap
13	July 14	at Grand Rapids Rampage	L 70–72	4–9	Van Andel Arena	Recap
14	July 22	Los Angeles Avengers	W 60–42	5–9	Myriad Convention Center	Recap

== After the season ==
During the season owner, Ed Gatlin forfeited ownership of the franchise. The League gained control of the franchise. After an unsuccessful attempt to find new ownership for the team, the league folded the Wranglers in November. The team has no connection to the Austin Wranglers an Arena Football League team from 2004 to 2008.

== See also ==
- 2001 Arena Football League season
