= 1943 Pittsburg State Gorillas football team =

American college football season

1943 Pittsburg State Gorillas football

CIC champion
- Conference: Central Intercollegiate Conference
- Record: 6–0 (2–0 CIC)
- Head coach: Charles Morgan (7th season)

The 1943 Pittsburg State Gorillas football team was an American football team that represented Kansas State Teachers College of Pittsburg—now known as Pittsburg State University—as one of two active members of the Central Intercollegiate Conference (CIC) during the 1943 college football season. In their tenth year under head coach Charles Morgan, the Gorillas compiled a perfect 6–0 record, outscored opponents by a total of 166 to 28, and were ranked at No. 73 among the nation's college and military service teams in the final 1943 Litkenhous Ratings. The Gorillas were the highest ranked team from Kansas in 1943, with Kansas ranked at No. 103 and Kansas State and Kansas State at No. 185.

A seventh game had been scheduled against the Norman Zoomers for late November, but that team disbanded.

== Schedule ==
Date	Opponent	Site	Result	Attendance	Source
September 24	at Central Missouri State*	Warrensburg, MO	W 20–0		
October 8	at Washburn	Topeka, KS	W 39–0		
October 26	Washburn	Pittsburg, KS	W 27–7		
November 6	William Jewell*	Pittsburg, KS	W 13–0		
November 20	vs. Missouri Mines*	Walsh Stadium; St. Louis, MO	W 34–14	1,500	
November 25	at William Jewell*	Liberty, MO	W 32–6		
*Non-conference game
