= Wally A. Forsberg =

American football and basketball coach

Biographical details
- Born: February 15, 1909
- Died: April 5, 1999 (aged 90)

Coaching career (HC unless noted)

Football
- 1946–1948: Ottawa (KS)
- 1949–1951: Kansas Wesleyan

Basketball
- 1946–1949: Ottawa (KS)
- 1949–1952: Kansas Wesleyan

Head coaching record
- Overall: 31–22–3 (football); 43–27 (basketball)

Accomplishments and honors

Championships
- Football; 2 KCAC (1947–1948)

Wally A. Forsberg (February 15, 1909 – April 5, 1999) was an American college football and college basketball coach.

== Coaching career ==
=== Ottawa ===
Forsberg was the head football coach at the Ottawa University in Ottawa, Kansas for three seasons, from 1946 to 1948, compiling a record of 20–6–2. Forsberg also coached basketball at the school during his tenure.

=== Kansas Wesleyan ===
Forsberg next traveled to Salina, Kansas to become the 12th head football coach at Kansas Wesleyan University. Forsberg held that position for three seasons, from 1949 until 1951. His coaching record at Kansas Wesleyan was 11–16–1.

== Head coaching record ==
=== Football ===
Year	Team	Overall	Conference	Standing	Bowl/playoffs
Ottawa Braves (Kansas Collegiate Athletic Conference) (1946–1948)
1946	Ottawa	7–1–1	4–1–1	T–2nd	
1947	Ottawa	6–2–1	6–0	1st	
1948	Ottawa	7–3	6–0	1st	
Ottawa:		20–6–2	16–1–1		
Kansas Wesleyan Coyotes (Kansas Collegiate Athletic Conference) (1949–1951)
1949	Kansas Wesleyan	3–6	3–3	T–4th	
1950	Kansas Wesleyan	3–6–1	3–2–1	3rd	
1951	Kansas Wesleyan	5–4	3–3	4th	
Kansas Wesleyan:		11–16–1	9–8–1		
Total:		31–22–3			
National championship Conference title Conference division title or championship game berth
