= Kevin Verdugo =

American football player and coach (born 1968)

Biographical details
- Born: September 16, 1968 (age 58); Pittsburg, Kansas, U.S.

Playing career
- 1987: Kansas
- 1988–1991: Colorado State
- Position: Quarterback

Coaching career (HC unless noted)
- 1994–1996: Southeast Missouri State (QB/WR)
- 1997–1998: Northern Michigan (OC/QB)
- 2000: Southern Illinois (QB)
- 2001–2003: Fort Scott
- 2004: Akron (AHC/RB)
- 2005–2010: Fort Hays State

Head coaching record
- Overall: 18–47 (college); 9–18 (junior college)

Accomplishments and honors

Awards
- KJCCC Coach of the Year (2001)

Kevin Verdugo (born September 16, 1968) is an American former college football player and coach. He served as the head football coach at Fort Hays State University in Hays, Kansas from 2005 to 2010, compiling a record of 18–47. Verdugo was the head football coach at Fort Scott Community College in Fort Scott, Kansas from 2001 to 2003, tallying a mark of 9–18.

== Coaching career ==
=== Fort Scott Community College ===
Verdugo was the head coach at Fort Scott Community College, where he was named the 2001 Kansas Jayhawk Conference Coach of the Year.

=== Fort Hays State ===
After Fort Scott, Verdugo was named the head coach for the Fort Hays Tigers located in Hays, Kansas. He has held that position from 2005 to the end of the 2010 season and was the 22nd football coach at the school. His career coaching record at Fort Hays was 18 wins and 47 losses.

After the end of the 2010 season when the team produced a record of 3–8, it was announced that he would not return for the 2011 season.

== Head coaching record ==
=== College ===
Year	Team	Overall	Conference	Standing	Bowl/playoffs
Fort Hays State (Rocky Mountain Athletic Conference) (2005)
2005	Fort Hays State	2–8	2–6	T–7th	
Fort Hays State (Mid-America Intercollegiate Athletics Association) (2006–2010)
2006	Fort Hays State	1–10	1–8	T–9th	
2007	Fort Hays State	4–7	2–7	8th	
2008	Fort Hays State	2–9	1–8	10th	
2009	Fort Hays State	6–5	4–5	6th	
2010	Fort Hays State	3–8	1–8	10th	
Fort Hays State:		18–47	11–42		
Total:		18–47			

=== Junior college ===
Year	Team	Overall	Conference	Standing	Bowl/playoffs
Fort Scott Greyhounds (Kansas Jayhawk Community College Conference) (2001–2003)
2001	Fort Scott	5–4	5–2	T–3rd	
2002	Fort Scott	1–8	1–6	T–6th	
2003	Fort Scott	3–6	3–4	5th	
Fort Scott:		9–18	9–12		
Total:		9–18			
