= Bobby Thompson (American football coach) =

American football coach and administrator (born 1937)

Biographical details
- Born: August 2, 1937 (age 89); Guthrie, Oklahoma, U.S.

Playing career

Football
- c. 1958: Eastern Oklahoma A&M
- c. 1960: Adams State

Baseball
- c. 1958: Eastern Oklahoma A&M
- c. 1960: Adams State
- Position: Quarterback (football)

Coaching career (HC unless noted)

Football
- 1961–1962: Highland HS (NM) (assistant)
- 1963: Highland HS (NM)
- 1964–1965: Altus HS (OK)
- 1966–1968: Oklahoma State (assistant)
- 1969–1972: Idaho (OC)
- 1973: West Texas State (DB)
- 1974: Northwestern Oklahoma State
- 1975: Ardmore HS (OK)
- 1977–1978: Kansas State (DB/RC)
- 1979–1980: Fort Hays State
- 1984: Fort Hays State
- 1985–?: Nebraska–Omaha (assistant)

Administrative career (AD unless noted)
- 1980–1981: Fort Hays State
- 1981–1982: South Dakota
- 1985–1988: Nebraska–Omaha
- 1988–1999: UTSA

Head coaching record
- Overall: 16–23–2 (college)

Bobby Thompson (born August 2, 1937) is an American former football coach and college athletics administrator. He served at the head football coach at Northwestern Oklahoma State University in 1974 and two stints as the head football coach at Fort Hays State University in Hays, Kansas, from 1979 to 1980 and again in 1984, compiling a career college football coaching record of 16–23–2. He was the athletic director at Fort Hays State from 1980 to 1981, the University of South Dakota from 1981 to 1982, the University of Nebraska Omaha from 1985 to 1988, and University of Texas at San Antonio (USTA) from 1988 to 1999.

Thompson was born on August 2, 1937, in Guthrie, Oklahoma, and attended Guthrie High School there. He played football and baseball at Eastern Oklahoma Agricultural and Mechanical College—now known as Eastern Oklahoma State College—in Wilburton, Oklahoma and at Adams State College—now known as Adams State University—in Alamosa, Colorado.

== Head coaching record ==
=== College ===
Year	Team	Overall	Conference	Standing	Bowl/playoffs
Northwestern Oklahoma State Rangers (Oklahoma Intercollegiate Conference) (1974)
1974	Northwestern Oklahoma State	7–3	2–2	3rd	
Northwestern Oklahoma State:		7–3	2–2		
Fort Hays State Tigers (Central States Intercollegiate Conference) (1979–1980)
1979	Fort Hays State	5–6	3–4	T–3rd	
1980	Fort Hays State	4–4–2	3–2–2	T–3rd	
Fort Hays State Tigers (Central States Intercollegiate Conference) (1984)
1984	Fort Hays State	0–10	0–7	8th	
Fort Hays State:		9–20–2	6–13–2		
Total:		16–23–2			
