= Ralph Archer =

American football coach

Coaching career (HC unless noted)
- 1920: Fort Hays State

Head coaching record
- Overall: 2–5–1

Ralph Archer was an American football coach. He served as the head football coach at Fort Hays State University in Hays, Kansas and he held that position for the 1920 season. His career coaching record at Fort Hays was 2–5–1.
