= Virgil Baer =

American football and basketball coach

Biographical details
- Born: December 5, 1912; Dickinson County, Kansas, U.S.
- Died: July 14, 1993 (aged 80); San Antonio, Texas, U.S.

Coaching career (HC unless noted)

Football
- 1946–1948: Kansas Wesleyan

Basketball
- 1946–1949: Kansas Wesleyan

Head coaching record
- Overall: 12–12–3 (football); 42–21 (basketball)

Accomplishments and honors

Awards
- First-team Little All-American (1935)

Virgil Baer (December 5, 1912 – July 14, 1993) was an American football and basketball coach. He was the 11th head football coach at Kansas Wesleyan University in Salina, Kansas, serving for three seasons, from 1946 to 1948, and compiling a record of 12–12–3.

== Head coaching record ==
=== Football ===
Year	Team	Overall	Conference	Standing	Bowl/playoffs
Kansas Wesleyan Coyotes (Kansas Collegiate Athletic Conference) (1946–1948)
1946	Kansas Wesleyan	3–4–2	2–3–1	5th	
1947	Kansas Wesleyan	4–4–1	3–2–1	4th	
1948	Kansas Wesleyan	5–4	3–3	T–3rd	
Kansas Wesleyan:		12–12–3	8–8–2		
Total:		12–12–3			
