= Marty Peters =

American football player (c.1913–??)

Biographical details
- Born: December 27, 1912; Peoria, Illinois, U.S.
- Died: August 5, 1997 (aged 84); New Philadelphia, Ohio, U.S.
- Education: University of Notre Dame

Playing career

Football
- 1933–1935: Notre Dame

Basketball
- 1933–1936: Notre Dame
- Positions: End (football); Forward (basketball)

Coaching career (HC unless noted)

Football
- 1936: St. Teresa HS (IL)
- 1937–1941: St. Benedict's
- 1946–1947: St. Benedict's

Basketball
- 1936–1937: St. Teresa HS (IL)
- 1937–1942: St. Benedict's
- 1946–1948: St. Benedict's

Administrative career (AD unless noted)
- 1937–?: St. Benedict's

Head coaching record
- Overall: 29–24–5 (college football); 78–73 (college basketball)

Accomplishments and honors

Championships
- Football; 1 CIC (1940)

Martin J. Peters (December 27, 1912 – August 5, 1997) was an American football and basketball player, athletic director, and coach. Born in Peoria, Illinois, he attended Spalding Institute before enrolling at the University of Notre Dame. After Notre Dame, he coached at St. Theresa High School and St. Benedict's College. He was also a World War II veteran and served in the Navy.

== Notre Dame football ==
Marty made his first appearance with the Notre Dame varsity football team against Kansas in 1933 and went on to play in five additional games that season. In 1934, he appeared in every game except the Texas contest and distinguished himself as a strong, determined competitor. Known for his fighting, driving style of play, Marty became part of a well-balanced backfield under Coach Tom Hamilton. One of Marty’s notable moments came in the 1934 Navy game, when he caught a pass and carried the ball across the goal line for Notre Dame’s only score. His points after touchdown also helped the Irish add valuable scoring on several occasions. At a dinner for the Christian Brothers High School, he spoke of football tenure at Notre Dame. "It was in the Pittsburgh game of 1935 that I made my one bid for fame. In the late three minutes of play with the score tied at 6-6, I kicked a field goal to win the game."

== Notre Dame basketball ==
After football season, Marty traded his football gear for a basketball uniform and played center under Coach Keogan. During his first basketball season in 1933, his performance was strong enough that Keogan moved All-American Krause to guard to make room for Marty at center. He later became the team’s leading scorer. During the summer, Marty drove a truck in Peoria to stay in shape, a demanding job that added to his athletic conditioning. One day, he hoped to become a successful coach someday.

== 1936 NFL draft ==
He was drafted in the seventh round of the 1936 NFL Draft to the Pittsburgh Pirates.

== Coaching career ==
He began his coaching career at St. Teresa High School in Decatur, Illinois. He served two stints as the head football coach at St. Benedict's College—now known as Benedictine College—in Atchison, Kansas, from 1937 to 1941 and again from 1946 to 1947, compiling a record of 29–24–5. Peters was also the head basketball coach at St. Benedict's, tallying a mark of 78–73. Benedictine College recognizes him for helping the institution gain admission to the Central Intercollegiate Conference in 1939 and for leading the rebuilding of its athletic program after World War II. During his tenure, the Ravens football team won 29, lost 25, and tied five games. During the same time period, the Ravens basketball team won 78 and lost 73. He took St. Benedict's to the Central Conference in 1938 and Midlands Conference in 1947. By 1948, he resigned from his post at St. Benedict's in May 1948 to take a job with a beverage company in Atchison.

== World War II service ==
On May 18, 1942, he left St. Benedicts for Annapolis basic training. Larry "Moon" Mullins took over briefly as head coach. Peters served in the United States Navy during World War II and was discharged as a lieutenant commander. He returned to St. Benedict's after the war.

== Head coaching record ==
=== College football ===
Year	Team	Overall	Conference	Standing	Bowl/playoffs
St. Benedict's Ravens (Independent) (1937–1938)
1937	St. Benedict's	4–3–2			
1938	St. Benedict's	4–2–1			
St. Benedict's Ravens (Central Intercollegiate Conference) (1939–1941)
1939	St. Benedict's	5–3	3–2	T–2nd	
1940	St. Benedict's	6–4	4–0	1st	
1941	St. Benedict's	5–2–1	2–1–1	T–2nd	
St. Benedict's Ravens (Central Intercollegiate Conference) (1946–1947)
1946	St. Benedict's	4–2–1	2–2–1	3rd	
1947	St. Benedict's	1–8	0–5	6th	
St. Benedict's:		29–24–5	11–10–2		
Total:		29–24–5			
National championship Conference title Conference division title or championship game berth

== See also ==
- List of college football head coaches with non-consecutive tenure
