= S. Woodrow Sponaugle =

American football and basketball coach

Biographical details
- Born: September 24, 1915; Marshall, West Virginia, U.S.
- Died: April 30, 1967 (aged 51); Lancaster, Pennsylvania, U.S.

Playing career

Football
- 1934–1936: Franklin & Marshall
- Position: Center

Coaching career (HC unless noted)

Football
- 1937: Emmaus HS (PA) (assistant)
- 1938–1940: Columbia HS (PA)
- 1941–1942: Newark Academy (NJ)
- 1943–1947: J. P. McCaskey HS (PA)
- 1948–1962: Franklin & Marshall

Basketball
- 1938–1941: Columbia HS (PA)
- 1941–1943: Newark Academy (NJ)
- 1948–1963: Franklin & Marshall

Track
- 1938–1941: Columbia HS (PA)
- 1941–1943: Newark Academy (NJ)

Administrative career (AD unless noted)
- 1963–1967: Franklin & Marshall

Head coaching record
- Overall: 59–58–6 (college football); 141–140 (college basketball)

Accomplishments and honors

Awards
- First-team Little All-American (1935)

Solomon Woodrow Sponaugle (September 24, 1915 – April 30, 1967) was an American football, basketball, and track and field coach.

== Biography ==
Sponaugle was born on September 24, 1915, in Marshall, West Virginia, to William Okey Sponaugle and Emma Warner. He and his family moved to a farm near Hershey, Pennsylvania. Sponaugle graduated from Hershey High School in 1933, and then played football, basketball, and track and field at Franklin & Marshall College.

Sponaugle served as the head football coach at Franklin & Marshall College in Lancaster, Pennsylvania. He held that position for 15 seasons, from 1948 until 1962. His football coaching record at Franklin & Marshall was 59–58–6. He previously taught at a Lancaster County high school.

Sponaugle died on April 30, 1967, at Lancaster General Hospital in Lancaster, Pennsylvania, after a long illness.

== Head coaching record ==
=== College football ===
Year	Team	Overall	Conference	Standing	Bowl/playoffs
Franklin & Marshall Diplomats (Independent) (1948–1957)
1948	Franklin & Marshall	5–3–1			
1949	Franklin & Marshall	2–5–2			
1950	Franklin & Marshall	9–0			
1951	Franklin & Marshall	5–4			
1952	Franklin & Marshall	7–1			
1953	Franklin & Marshall	5–2			
1954	Franklin & Marshall	3–5			
1955	Franklin & Marshall	2–6			
1956	Franklin & Marshall	5–2–1			
1957	Franklin & Marshall	4–2–1			
Franklin & Marshall Diplomats (Middle Atlantic Conference) (1958–1962)
1958	Franklin & Marshall	5–4	3–1	NA (Southern College)	
1959	Franklin & Marshall	4–3–1	1–2–1	NA (Southern College)	
1960	Franklin & Marshall	2–6	1–2	NA (Southern College)	
1961	Franklin & Marshall	1–7	0–3	NA (Southern College)	
1962	Franklin & Marshall	0–8	0–5	10th est(Southern College)	
Franklin & Marshall:		59–58–6	5–13–1		
Total:		59–58–6			
