= Thomas C. Hayden =

American football coach

Coaching career (HC unless noted)
- 1940–1946: McPherson

Head coaching record
- Overall: 8–22–3

Thomas C. Hayden was an American football coach. He was the head football coach at McPherson College in McPherson, Kansas from 1940 to 1946, compiling a record of 8–22–3. Hayden had previously worked as an assistant coach at Coe College.

== Head coaching record ==
Year	Team	Overall	Conference	Standing	Bowl/playoffs
McPherson Bulldogs (Kansas Collegiate Athletic Conference) (1940–1946)
1940	McPherson	2–7	2–4	T–5th	
1941	McPherson	1–8	1–5	T–5th	
1942	McPherson	1–4–3	1–4–1	T–6th	
1943	No team—World War II				
1944	No team—World War II				
1945	No team—World War II				
1946	McPherson	4–3–1	3–2–1	4th	
McPherson:		8–22–3	7–13–2		
Total:		8–22–3			
