= William D. Weidlein =

American football player and coach (1892–1983)

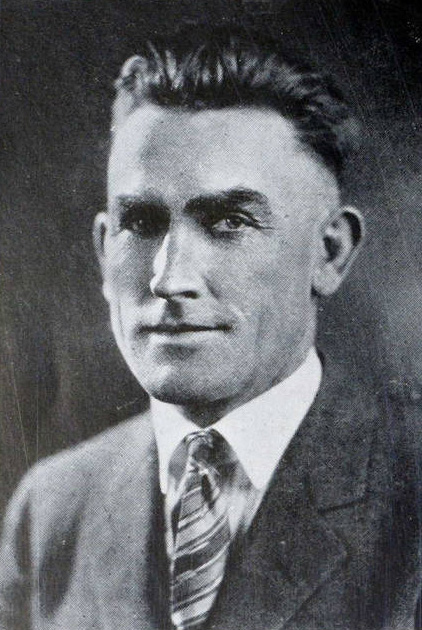
- Weidlein in 1925 Reveille (Fort Hays yearbook)

Biographical details
- Born: January 11, 1892; Peabody, Kansas, U.S.
- Died: December 26, 1983 (aged 91); Cedar Rapids, Iowa, U.S.

Playing career
- 1911–1913: Kansas
- Positions: Guard, Tackle

Coaching career (HC unless noted)
- 1914: Kansas (assistant)
- 1915–1916: Midland
- 1923–1928: Fort Hays State

Head coaching record
- Overall: 26–32–6

William Dale Weidlein (January 11, 1892 – December 26, 1983) was an American football coach. He served as the head football coach at Midland College (now known as Midland University) in Fremont, Nebraska, from 1915 to 1916 and Fort Hays State University in Hays, Kansas, from 1923 to 1928, compiling a career college football coaching record of 26–32–6.

== Personal life ==
William was born in Peabody, Kansas, on January 11, 1892, of parents John Valentine Weidlein and Emma Belle (Van Dyke) Weidlein. His uncle, Philip P. Weidlein, was the second mayor of Peabody, Kansas, in 1879.

William attended the University of Kansas and graduated in 1914. He was a member of the 108th engineers in France during World War I. He married Ruth Rebecca Benning on December 16, 1917. William died in Cedar Rapids, Iowa, on December 26, 1983, and was buried in the Leavenworth National Cemetery.

== Head coaching record ==
Year	Team	Overall	Conference	Standing	Bowl/playoffs
Midland Warriors (Independent) (1915–1916)
1915	Midland	4–3			
1916	Midland	3–5			
Midland:		7–8			
Fort Hays State Tigers (Kansas Collegiate Athletic Conference) (1923–1927)
1923	Fort Hays State	4–3–2	3–3–2	T–8th	
1924	Fort Hays State	4–4	3–4	10th	
1925	Fort Hays State	2–4–1	1–4–1	T–11th	
1926	Fort Hays State	3–5	2–5	T–12th	
1927	Fort Hays State	3–5–1	2–4–1	T–10th	
Fort Hays State Tigers (Central Intercollegiate Conference) (1928)
1928	Fort Hays State	3–3–2	3–2–1	4th	
Fort Hays State:		19–24–6	14–22–4		
Total:		26–32–6			
