= Bill Bearley =

American sports coach (1902–1999)

Bill Bearly
Biographical details
- Born: November 20, 1902; Atwood, Kansas, U.S.
- Died: August 14, 1999 (aged 96); Valley Center, California, U.S.

Playing career

Football
- 1930s: Fort Hays State

Coaching career (HC unless noted)

Football
- 1942: Fort Hays State

Baseball
- 1946: Wyoming

Head coaching record
- Overall: 1–8 (football); 3–6 (baseball)

William L. Bearley (November 20, 1902 – August 14, 1999) was an American football, baseball, and tennis coach. He was the 11th head football coach at Fort Hays State University in Hays, Kansas and he held that position for the 1942 season. His record at Fort Hays was 1–8.

== Head coaching record ==
=== Football ===
Year	Team	Overall	Conference	Standing	Bowl/playoffs
Fort Hays State Tigers (Central Intercollegiate Conference) (1946–1955)
1942	Fort Hays State	1–8	0–5	6th	
Fort Hays State:		1–8	0–5		
Total:		1–8			
