= George Woodward (American football) =

American football player and coach (1894–1968)

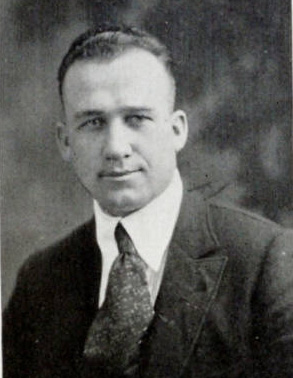
- Woodward pictured in Reveille 1923, Fort Hays yearbook

Biographical details
- Born: October 25, 1894 near Clinton, Kansas, U.S.
- Died: December 27, 1968 (aged 74) near Chillicothe, Missouri, U.S.

Playing career

Football
- 1917: Kansas
- Position: Running back

Coaching career (HC unless noted)

Football
- 1920–1922: Fort Hays State
- 1923–1926: Washburn

Basketball
- 1920–1923: Fort Hays State

Administrative career (AD unless noted)
- 1923–1927: Washburn

Head coaching record
- Overall: 17–33–6 (football); 14–33 (basketball)

Accomplishments and honors

Championships
- Football; 1 KCAC (1921)

George J. "Rook" Woodward (October 25, 1894 – December 27, 1968) was an American football player and coach of football and basketball.

== Coaching career ==
=== Fort Hays State ===
Woodward was the fifth head college football coach for the Fort Hays State University Tigers located in Hays, Kansas and he held that position for three seasons, from 1920 until 1922. Football legend Walter Camp called the 1922 team "a well disciplined organization that fought as a unit.

=== Washburn ===
Woodward left Fort Hays to become the 18th head football coach for Washburn University in Topeka, Kansas and he held that position for four seasons, from 1923 until 1926. His overall coaching record at Washburn was 7 wins, 23 losses, and 4 ties. This ranks him 21st at Washburn in terms of total wins and 32nd at Washburn in terms of winning percentage.

== Later life ==
In 1938, Woodward led an insurance organization in Cincinnati, Ohio. He died in a car accident near Chillicothe, Missouri in 1968. He had been living in Columbus, Missouri at the time and was 74 years old.

== Head coaching record ==
=== Football ===
Year	Team	Overall	Conference	Standing	Bowl/playoffs
Fort Hays State Tigers (Kansas Collegiate Athletic Conference) (1920–1922)
1920	Fort Hays State	2–5–1	2–3–1	T–9th	
1921	Fort Hays State	6–1	6–0	1st	
1922	Fort Hays State	2–4–1	2–4–1	12th	
Fort Hays State:		10–10–2	10–7–2		
Washburn Ichabods (Kansas Collegiate Athletic Conference) (1923–1926)
1923	Washburn	0–8–2	0–6–2	16th	
1924	Washburn	2–7	1–6	6th	
1925	Washburn	2–4–1	2–4–1	10th	
1926	Washburn	3–4–1	3–3–1	8th	
Washburn:		7–23–4	6–19–4		
Total:		17–33–6			
