= Ira Van Cleave =

American football and baseball coach

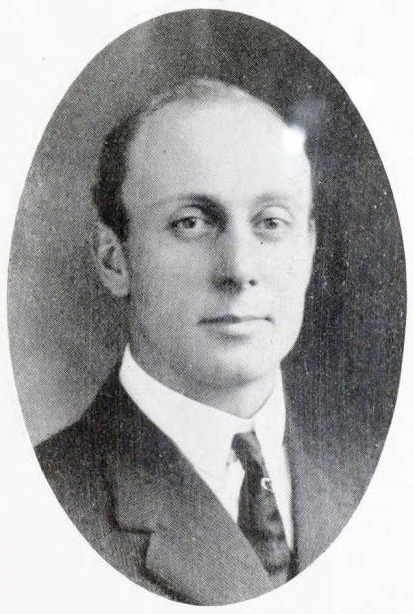
- Van Cleave pictured in Reveille 1914, Fort Hays yearbook

Biographical details
- Born: July 30, 1888; Peoria, Iowa, U.S.
- Died: May 29, 1943 (aged 54); Pomona, California, U.S.

Playing career

Baseball
- 1910–1912: Springfield

Coaching career (HC unless noted)

Football
- 1912–1914: Hays Normal
- 1917–1919: Whittier
- 1920–1925: Pomona HS (CA)
- 1927: La Verne (freshmen)
- 1928–1929: La Verne

Basketball
- 1912–1915: Hays Normal
- 1917–1920: Whittier
- 1920–1926: Pomona HS (CA)
- 1927–1930: La Verne

Baseball
- 1917–1920: Whittier
- 1921–1926: Pomona HS (CA)
- 1928–?: La Verne (freshmen)

Track
- 1920–1926: Pomona HS (CA)
- 1927–?: La Verne

Administrative career (AD unless noted)
- 1912–1915: Hays Normal
- 1928–1930: La Verne

Head coaching record
- Overall: 11–25–1 (college football)

Ira Harlan "Sphinx" Van Cleave (July 30, 1888 – May 29, 1943) was an American football, basketball, baseball, and track and field coach, athletics administrator, and physical education instructor. He served as the head football coach at Fort Hays Kansas State Normal School—now known as Fort Hays State University—in Hays, Kansas from 1912 to 1914, Whittier College in Whittier, California from 1917 to 1919, and La Verne College—now known as the University of La Verne—in La Verne, California from in 1928 to 1929.

== Early life and education ==
Van Cleave was born on July 30, 1888, in Peoria, Iowa. He graduated from Central College in Pella, Iowa in 1909 and International YMCA College—now known as Springfield College—in Springfield, Massachusetts in 1912.

== Coaching career ==
Van Cleave resigned from his position at Hays Normal in the summer of 1915 and moved to California. He was hired in 1917 as athletic coach at Whittier College in Whittier, California, succeeding Russell T. Wilson. Van Cleave left Whittier in 1920 to become the athletic director at Pomona High School in Pomona, California. He led the Pomona High baseball team to a Citrus Belt League title in 1926. In June 1926, the Pomona school board opted to retain Van Cleave at athletic coach, but offered him the position of physical education instructor.

Van Cleave was hired by La Verne College—now known as the University of La Verne—in La Verne, California as varsity basketball and track coach and freshman coach in football and baseball. He succeeded Claude Arnett as head football coach in 1928. Van Cleave resigned as head athletic coach at La Verne in early 1930 and was succeeded by Lee Eisan.

== Death ==
Van Cleave died on May 29, 1943, at Pomona Valley Community Hospital in Pomona, California.

== Head coaching record ==
=== College football ===
Year	Team	Overall	Conference	Standing	Bowl/playoffs
Hays Normal (Kansas Intercollegiate Athletic Conference) (1912–1914)
1912	Hays Normal	1–1			
1913	Hays Normal	4–2	0–1	12th	
1914	Hays Normal	5–2			
Fort Hays State:		10–5			
Whittier Poets (Southern California Intercollegiate Athletic Conference) (1917–1920)
1917	Whittier	1–4			
1918	Whittier	0–0–1			
1919	Whittier	0–5	0–4	5th	
Whittier:		1–9–1			
La Verne Leopards (Independent) (1928–1929)
1928	La Verne	0–6			
1929	La Verne	0–5			
La Verne:		0–11			
Total:		11–25–1			
