= Bill Giles (American football) =

American football player and coach (1932–1998)

Biographical details
- Born: March 10, 1932; Chicago, Illinois, U.S.
- Died: May 28, 1998 (aged 66); Rapid City, South Dakota, U.S.

Playing career

Football
- 1951–1954: Nebraska

Baseball
- 1952: Nebraska
- 1954–1955: Nebraska
- Positions: End (football); First baseman (baseball)

Coaching career (HC unless noted)

Football
- 1956: Bertrand HS (NE)
- 1957: Sidney HS (NE)
- 1958–1959: Norfolk HS (NE)
- 1960–1963: Kearney State (line)
- 1964–1965: Eastern New Mexico (assistant)
- 1966: Hiram Scott (assistant)
- 1967–1971: Chadron State
- 1972–1978: Fort Hays State

Basketball
- 1957–1958: Sidney HS (NE)
- c. 1960: Kearney State (assistant)

Baseball
- 1961–1964: Kearney State
- 1965–1966: Eastern New Mexico

Head coaching record
- Overall: 51–64–3 (college football)

Accomplishments and honors

Championships
- Football; 1 CSIC (1976) Baseball; 1 NCC (1963)

William F. Giles (March 10, 1932 – May 28, 1998) was an American college football and college baseball player and coach. He served as the head football coach at Chadron State College in Chadron, Nebraska from 1967 to 1971 and at Fort Hays State University in Hays, Kansas from 1972 until 1978, compiling a career college football head coaching record of 51–64–3. Giles was also the head baseball coach at Kearney State College—now known as the University of Nebraska at Kearney—from 1961 to 1964 and Eastern New Mexico University from 1965 to 1966.

A native of Alliance, Nebraska, Giles played football as an end at the University of Nebraska–Lincoln from 1951 to 1954. He also lettered in baseball at Nebraska in 1952, 1954, and 1944. Giles died on May 28, 1998, in Rapid City, South Dakota.

== Head coaching record ==
=== College football ===
Year	Team	Overall	Conference	Standing	Bowl/playoffs
Chadron State Eagles (Nebraska College Conference) (1967–1971)
1967	Chadron State	3–6	2–2	3rd	
1968	Chadron State	8–1	3–1	2nd	
1969	Chadron State	6–3	2–1	2nd	
1970	Chadron State	5–4	1–2	3rd	
1971	Chadron State	5–4	1–2	3rd	
Chadron State:		27–20	9–8		
Fort Hays State Tigers (Great Plains Athletic Conference) (1972–1975)
1972	Fort Hays State	1–8–1	1–5	T–6th	
1973	Fort Hays State	5–4	2–3	T–3rd	
1974	Fort Hays State	1–9	1–4	T–4th	
1975	Fort Hays State	3–7	2–3	T–4th	
Fort Hays State Tigers (Central States Intercollegiate Conference) (1976–1978)
1976	Fort Hays State	5–4	5–1	T–1st	
1977	Fort Hays State	3–7–1	1–5–1	T–7th	
1978	Fort Hays State	6–5–1	4–2–1	T–2nd	
Fort Hays State:		24–44–3	16–23–2		
Total:		51–64–3			
National championship Conference title Conference division title or championship game berth
