= W. G. Speer =

American football and basketball coach (1884–1955)

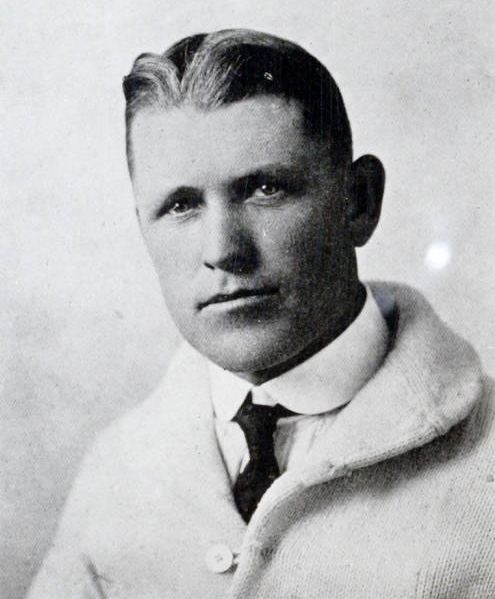
- Speer pictured in Reveille 1917, Fort Hays yearbook

Biographical details
- Born: November 6, 1884; Kansas, U.S.
- Died: April 24, 1955 (aged 70); Manhattan, Kansas, U.S.

Playing career

Football
- 1908–1910: Kansas State

Coaching career (HC unless noted)

Football
- c. 1912: Kansas State (freshmen)
- 1915–1918: Hays Normal
- 1919–1922: Peru Normal
- 1923–1934: Midland

Basketball
- 1916–1919: Hays Normal
- 1919–1923: Peru Normal

Head coaching record
- Overall: 50–21–3 (football); 71–22 (basketball)

Accomplishments and honors

Championships
- Football; 1 KCAC (1917)

Whitcomb Glenn "Bunt" Speer (November 6, 1884 – April 24, 1955) was an American football and basketball coach. He served as the head football coach at Fort Hays State University in Hays, Kansas from 1915 to 1918 and Nebraska State Normal School—now known as Peru State College–from 1919 to 1922, and Midland College—now known as Midland University—in Fremont, Nebraska from 1923 to 1924, compiling a career college football coaching record of 50–21–3. Speer was also the head basketball coach at Nebraska State Normal from 1919 to 1923, tallying a mark of 71–22.

While coaching at Fort Hays, he led the Tigers to 12 consecutive victories from the second game in the 1916 season to seventh game in the 1917 season—a record that stands as of the conclusion of the 2007 season. His 1915 and 1917 teams also are tied for the most consecutive games without being scored upon.

Speer died of a heart attack, on April 24, 1955, at a hospital in Manhattan, Kansas.

== Head coaching record ==
=== Football ===
Year	Team	Overall	Conference	Standing	Bowl/playoffs
Hays Normal (Kansas Collegiate Athletic Conference) (1915–1918)
1915	Hays Normal	4–3	3–3	T–6th	
1916	Hays Normal	5–2	4–1	2nd	
1917	Hays Normal	7–0	6–0	T–1st	
1918	Hays Normal	2–1			
Hays Normal:		18–6			
Peru Normal Bobocats (Nebraska Intercollegiate Conference) (1919–1922)
1919	Peru Normal	5–2	4–2	T–3rd	
1920	Peru Normal	5–4	5–4	6th	
1921	Peru Normal	5–3	5–3	4th	
1922	Peru Normal	6–1	5–1	2nd	
Peru Normal:		21–10	19–10		
Midland Warriors (Nebraska Intercollegiate Conference / Nebraska College Athletic Conference) (1923–1934)
1923	Midland	8–2–1	7–1–1	3rd	
1924	Midland	3–3–2	3–1–1	5th	
Midland:		11–5–3	10–2–2		
Total:		50–21–3			
National championship Conference title Conference division title or championship game berth
