= Sidney High School (Nebraska) =

Secondary school in Sidney, Nebraska, United States

Coordinates: 41°08′31″N 102°59′22″W

Location
- 1101 21st Avenue; Sidney, (Cheyenne County), Nebraska 69162; United States

Information
- Type: Public high school
- Principal: Ryan Plummer
- Teaching staff: 24.96 (FTE)
- Enrollment: 334 (2023-2024)
- Student to teacher ratio: 13.38
- Colors: Red and white
- Athletics conference: Western Conference
- Nickname: Red Raiders

Sidney High School is the only high school in the city of Sidney, Nebraska, United States. The total enrollment as of February 2009 was 386. A new $17 million building was under construction during the 2008-2009 school year and was completed shortly after school started in August 2009. The new school was dedicated in August 2009.

Sidney is in Class B in the Nebraska School Activities Association (NSAA). The school's mascot is the Red Raider. Sports offered at Sidney are football, volleyball, cross-country, wrestling, basketball, track and field, and golf. A cheer and dance team perform at home basketball games.

Sidney was once a power in most of these sports during the 1980s. The school experienced a downfall during the 1990s and early 2000s. Currently, Sidney is making a comeback in most sports. The football team was one game away from making the state playoffs, which hadn't been done since 1994. The boys' basketball team qualified for the 2009 NSAA State Tournament and placed third. The Raiders hadn't qualified for this tournament for 16 years before this. The boys' and girls' basketball teams qualified for the state tournament in 2010, which hadn't been done since 1984. The boys' golf team were state champions in 2007 and the girls' team have recently been to the state competition often as well.

Sidney also offers fine arts opportunities, including Speech, One-Act, the spring musical, and the Sidney Singers. The Oral Interpretation of Drama Team in 2010 were State Champions at State Speech.
