= Tim O'Connor (American football) =

American football player and coach (born 1967)

Biographical details
- Born: December 27, 1967 (age 58)

Playing career
- 1987–1990: Boise State

Coaching career (HC unless noted)
- 1998–?: Fort Hays State (DL)
- 2001–2004: Fort Hays State

Head coaching record
- Overall: 20–24

Tim O'Connor (born December 27, 1967) is an American former college football coach. He was the head football coach for Fort Hays State University from 2001 to 2004 after previously serving as an assistant. He played college football for Boise State.

== Head coaching record ==
Year	Team	Overall	Conference	Standing	Bowl/playoffs
Fort Hays State Tigers (Rocky Mountain Athletic Conference) (2001–2004)
2001	Fort Hays State	3–8	2–6	7th	
2002	Fort Hays State	5–6	3–5	7th	
2003	Fort Hays State	6–5	5–3	3rd	
2004	Fort Hays State	6–5	5–3	4th	
Fort Hays State:		20–24	15–17		
Total:		20–24			
