= Chris Brown (American football coach) =

American football player and coach (born 1974)

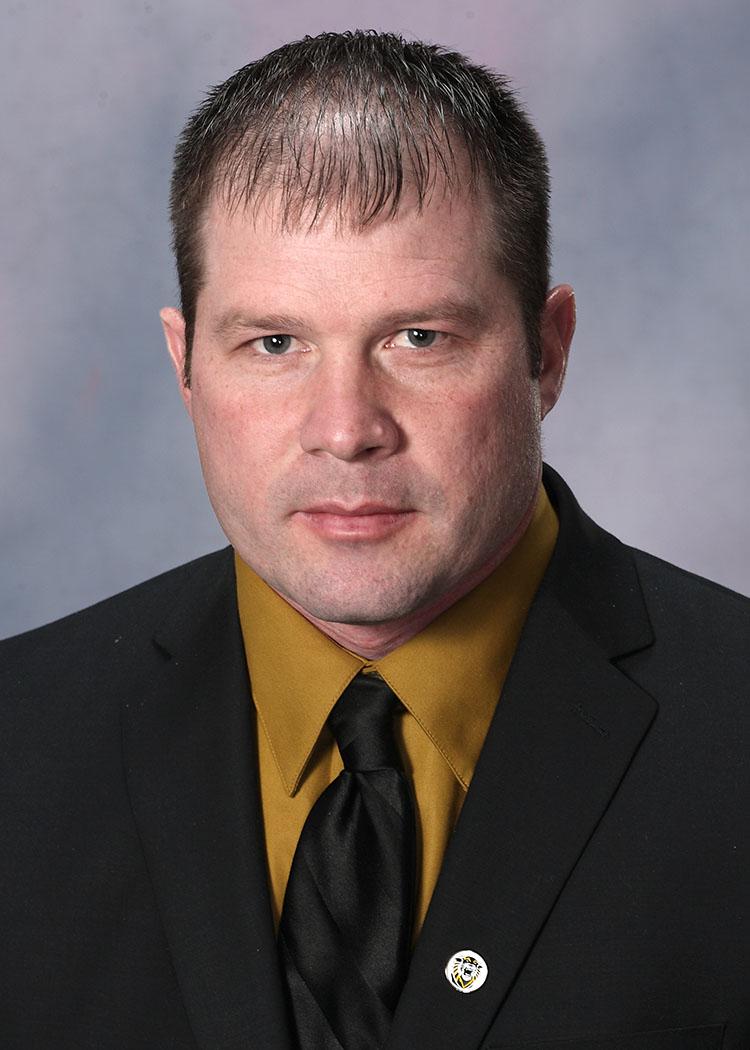

Current position
- Title: Head coach
- Team: Fort Hays State
- Conference: MIAA
- Record: 95–63
- Annual salary: $124,888

Biographical details
- Born: July 3, 1974 (age 52); Liberal, Kansas, U.S.

Playing career
- 1992–1995: Pittsburg State
- Position: Safety

Coaching career (HC unless noted)
- 1999–2001: Liberal HS (KS) (DC)
- 2002–2010: Washburn (DC)
- 2011–present: Fort Hays State

Head coaching record
- Overall: 95–63
- Bowls: 1–1
- Tournaments: 0–2 (NCAA D-II playoffs)

Accomplishments and honors

Championships
- 2 MIAA (2017–2018)

Christopher J. Brown (born July 3, 1974) is an American college football coach and former player. He is the head football coach for Fort Hays State University, a position he has held since 2011. He played for Pittsburg State University in Pittsburg, Kansas, from 1992 to 1995. He became the head coach at Fort Hays State in 2011.

== Playing career ==
Brown is a 1996 graduate of Pittsburg State University in Pittsburg, Kansas. As a player for the Gorillas, he recorded 470 tackles in 43 starts during his career at free safety. Brown is one of only three Gorillas to earn All-American honors three times.

As a player, Brown was a unanimous All-American First Team selection his senior year, was named the CNN NCAA Division II National Player of the Year in 1995, and was named to the NCAA Quarter Century Team for all players from 1975 to 1999 at free safety. Brown recorded a record 21 tackles in the NCAA Division II National Championship as a freshman against Jacksonville State and was inducted into the Pittsburg State Athletic Hall of Fame in 2006.

== Coaching career ==
=== High school and college assistant coaching ===
After completion of his playing time at Pittsburg State, Brown returned to his hometown Liberal, Kansas to be an assistant coach at Liberal High School from 1999 until the end of the 2001 season. He then became an assistant coach at Washburn University in Topeka, Kansas under head coach Craig Schurig from 2002 until completion of the 2010 season.

=== Fort Hays State ===
Brown was named the head coach for the Fort Hays Tigers located in Hays, Kansas beginning with the 2011 season. His team went 4–7 in the first season. The first game of the season was a 27–17 victory over cross-state rival Emporia State. In 2017, Brown broke a school record by leading the team to an undefeated regular season, the first in 100 years.

== Head coaching record ==
Year	Team	Overall	Conference	Standing	Bowl/playoffs
Fort Hays State Tigers (Mid-America Intercollegiate Athletics Association) (2011–present)
2011	Fort Hays State	4–7	3–6	T–6th	
2012	Fort Hays State	5–6	4–6	T–9th	
2013	Fort Hays State	6–5	4–5	8th	
2014	Fort Hays State	7–4	7–4	T–4th	
2015	Fort Hays State	8–4	8–3	T–3rd	L Mineral Water
2016	Fort Hays State	8–4	7–4	T–4th	W C.H.A.M.P.S. Heart of Texas
2017	Fort Hays State	11–1	11–0	1st	L NCAA Division II Second Round
2018	Fort Hays State	9–3	9–2	T–1st	L NCAA Division II First Round
2019	Fort Hays State	8–3	8–3	T–3rd	
2020–21	No team—COVID-19				
2021	Fort Hays State	5–6	5–6	7th	
2022	Fort Hays State	3–8	3–8	10th	
2023	Fort Hays State	7–4	6–4	T–5th	
2024	Fort Hays State	8–3	6–3	T–3rd	
2025	Fort Hays State	6–5	5–4	T–4th	
Fort Hays State:		95–63	86–58		
Total:		95–63			
National championship Conference title Conference division title or championship game berth
