= Fort Hays State Tigers =

- University: Fort Hays State University
- Conference: The MIAA (primary); GAC (men's soccer)
- NCAA: Division II
- Athletic director: Lisa Goddard McGuirk
- Location: Hays, Kansas
- Varsity teams: 18
- Football stadium: Lewis Field
- Basketball arena: Gross Memorial Coliseum
- Baseball stadium: Larks Park
- Mascot: Victor E. Tiger
- Nickname: Tigers
- Colors: Black and gold
- Website: fhsuathletics.com

The Fort Hays State Tigers are the athletic teams that represent Fort Hays State University, located in Hays, Kansas, in intercollegiate sports as a member of the NCAA Division II ranks, primarily competing in the Mid-America Intercollegiate Athletics Association (MIAA) for most of its sports since the 2006–07 academic year; while its men's soccer team competes in the Great American Conference (GAC). The Tigers previously competed in the Rocky Mountain Athletic Conference (RMAC) from 1989–90 to 2005–06 (which they were a member on a previous stint from 1968–69 to 1971–72); in the Central States Intercollegiate Conference (CSIC) of the National Association of Intercollegiate Athletics (NAIA) from 1976–77 to 1988–89; in the Great Plains Athletic Conference (GPAC) from 1972–73 to 1975–76; in the Central Intercollegiate Athletic Conference (CIC) from 1923–24 to 1967–68; and in the Kansas Collegiate Athletic Conference (KCAC) from 1902–03 to 1922–23.

== Athletics department overview ==
MIAA logo in Fort Hay State's colors

Fort Hays State offers eighteen sports at a varsity level. Entering the 2010–2011 school year, Fort Hays State has captured 58 Conference titles. They also have captured nine total national championships.

=== Conference membership history ===
- 1902–1927: Kansas Intercollegiate Athletic Association
- 1928–1968: Central Intercollegiate Conference
- 1969–1975: Rocky Mountain Athletic Conference
- 1976–1990: Central Intercollegiate Athletic Conference
- 1991–2006: Rocky Mountain Athletic Conference
- 2006–present: Mid-America Intercollegiate Athletics Association

== Varsity teams ==
Fort Hays State competes in 18 intercollegiate varsity sports: Men's sports include baseball, basketball, cross country, football, golf, soccer, track & field (indoor and outdoor) and wrestling; while women's sports include basketball, cross country, golf, soccer, softball, tennis, track & field (indoor and outdoor) and volleyball.

Men's sports	Women's sports
Baseball	Basketball
Basketball	Cross country
Cross country	Golf
Football	Soccer
Golf	Softball
Soccer	Tennis
Track and field^{†}	Track and field^{†}
Wrestling	Volleyball
† – Track and field includes both indoor and outdoor

=== Basketball ===
==== Men's ====
The Fort Hays State basketball program holds several national basketball titles; the men's team claimed national championships in 1984 and 1985 (NAIA), back to back, and in 1996 (NCAA Division II) with a 34–0 record. In 2020, the team upset Division I Kansas State with an 81–68 victory.

==== Women's ====
The women's basketball team also brought home the national title in 1991 (NAIA). The team is currently coached by Talia Kahrs.

=== Football ===
The football program at Fort Hays began in 1902. The first year a coach was assigned to the team was 1913 when Ira Van Cleave led the team to a record of 4 wins and 2 losses. Other coaches in the school's history include Wayne J. McConnell, Jim Gilstrap, James J. Yeager, and former Kansas Governor Andrew Frank Schoeppel. The coach beginning in 2011 is Chris Brown. Fort Hays State captured their first ever MIAA conference championship with a 13–12 win over Northwest Missouri State University on November 4, 2017, as they won their 10th game of the season against no losses with one regular season game against the University of Nebraska at Kearney remaining.

== National championships ==
=== Team ===
Sport	Association	Division	Year	Opponent/Runner-up	Score
Men's basketball (2)	NAIA (2)	Single (2)	1984	Wisconsin–Stevens Point	48–46 (OT)
Men's basketball (2)	NAIA (2)	Single (2)	1985	Wayland Baptist	82–80 (OT)
