= James J. Yeager =

American football player and coach (1909–1971)

Biographical details
- Born: February 2, 1909; Chase County, Kansas, U.S.
- Died: May 17, 1971 (aged 62); Boulder, Colorado, U.S.

Playing career
- 1928–1930: Kansas State
- Positions: Defensive lineman, guard

Coaching career (HC unless noted)
- 1935: Fort Hays State
- 1936: Iowa State (line)
- 1937–1940: Iowa State
- 1941–1943: Colorado
- 1946–1947: Colorado

Head coaching record
- Overall: 48–38–3

Accomplishments and honors

Championships
- 1 CIAC (1935); 2 Mountain States (1942–1943)

James J. "Gentleman Jim" Yeager (February 2, 1909 – May 17, 1971) was an American football player and coach. He served as the head football coach at Fort Hays State University (1935), Iowa State University (1937–1940), and the University of Colorado at Boulder (1941–1943, 1946–1947), compiling a career college football record of 48–38–3. Yeager won conference championships in 1935 with Fort Hays State and in 1942 and 1943 with Colorado.

== Playing career ==
Yeager played football as a defensive lineman and guard at Kansas State University from 1928 to 1930 and graduated from the university in 1931.

== Coaching career ==
=== Fort Hays State ===
Yeager got his start in coaching as the ninth head football coach for the Fort Hays Tigers located in Hays, Kansas, and he held that position for the 1935 season. His record at Fort Hays was 8–2. This ranks him 15th at Fort Hays in total wins and first at Fort Hays in winning percentage. That year, his team was declared the Central Intercollegiate Athletic Conference co-champions.

=== Iowa State ===
After his success at Fort Hays, Yeager was named the 16th head coach for the Iowa State University Cyclones located in Ames, Iowa, and he held that position for four seasons, from 1937 until 1940. His coaching record at Iowa state was 16–19–1. This ranks him 15th at Iowa state in total wins and 15th at Iowa state in winning percentage His best season came in 1938, when the team produced a record of 7–1–1.

=== Colorado ===
Yeager then returned to success as head coach of the Colorado Buffaloes where he coached five season between 1941 and 1947 with a two-year hiatus in 1944 and 1945. His record there stands at 24–17–2.

== Death ==
Yeager died of an apparent heart attack on May 17, 1971, at the age of 62.

== Head coaching record ==
Year	Team	Overall	Conference	Standing
Fort Hays State Tigers (Central Intercollegiate Conference) (1935)
1935	Fort Hays State	8–2	3–1	T–1st
Fort Hays State:		8–2	3–1	
Iowa State Cyclones (Big Six Conference) (1937–1940)
1937	Iowa State	3–6	1–4	T–5th
1938	Iowa State	7–1–1	3–1–1	2nd
1939	Iowa State	2–7	1–4	T–4th
1940	Iowa State	4–5	2–3	4th
Iowa State:		16–19–1	7–12–1	
Colorado Buffaloes (Mountain States Conference) (1941–1943)
1941	Colorado	3–4–1	3–2–1	T–4th
1942	Colorado	7–2	5–1	T–1st
1943	Colorado	5–2	2–0	1st
Colorado Buffaloes (Mountain States Conference) (1946–1947)
1946	Colorado	5–4–1	3–2–1	T–4th
1947	Colorado	4–5	3–3	T–3rd
Colorado:		24–17–2	16–8–2	
Total:		48–38–3		
National championship Conference title Conference division title or championship game berth
