= Ralph Huffman =

American football player and coach (1915–1979)

Biographical details
- Born: May 13, 1915; Asherville, Kansas, U.S.
- Died: May 7, 1979 (aged 63); Hays, Kansas, U.S.

Playing career

Football
- 1933–1936: Fort Hays State
- Position: Center

Coaching career (HC unless noted)

Football
- 1939–1941: Dodge City
- 1942: Fort Hays State (line)
- 1945: Kansas (assistant)
- 1946–1955: Fort Hays State

Track and field
- 1939–1942: Dodge City

Head coaching record
- Overall: 41–37–10 (college football); 8–12–3 (junior college football)

Accomplishments and honors

Championships
- Football; 1 CIAC

Donald Ralph "Red" Huffman Sr. (May 13, 1915 – May 7, 1979) was an American football and track and field coach. He was the 12th head football coach at the Fort Hays State University in Hays, Kansas, serving for ten seasons, from 1946 to 1955, and compiling a record of 41–37–10.

== Head coaching record ==
=== College football ===
Year	Team	Overall	Conference	Standing	Bowl/playoffs
Fort Hays State Tigers (Central Intercollegiate Conference) (1946–1955)
1946	Fort Hays State	2–4–2	1–2–2	T–4th	
1947	Fort Hays State	5–3–1	2–2–1	T–3rd	
1948	Fort Hays State	5–3–1	3–1–1	2nd	
1949	Fort Hays State	5–4	4–2	T–3rd	
1950	Fort Hays State	3–4–2	0–3–2	T–5th	
1951	Fort Hays State	5–4	2–3	T–4th	
1952	Fort Hays State	1–6–2	0–3–2	5th	
1953	Fort Hays State	3–4–1	2–2–1	T–3rd	
1954	Fort Hays State	7–2	4–1	T–1st	
1955	Fort Hays State	5–3–1	2–2–1	3rd	
Fort Hays State:		41–37–10	20–20–10		
Total:		41–37–10			
National championship Conference title Conference division title or championship game berth

=== Junior college football ===
Year	Team	Overall	Conference	Standing	Bowl/playoffs
Dodge City Conquistadors (Kansas Jayhawk Junior College Conference) (1939–1941)
1939	Dodge City		0–3	T–11th	
1940	Dodge City		2–1–1	4th	
1941	Dodge City		2–2	6th	
Dodge City:		8–12–3	4–6–1		
Total:		8–12–3			
