= Bob Cortese =

American football player and coach (born 1943)

Biographical details
- Born: March 8, 1943 (age 83)

Playing career
- 1964: Colorado
- Position: Guard

Coaching career (HC unless noted)
- ?–1974: Highland HS (CO)
- 1975–1977: Arvada HS (CO)
- 1978–1979: Colorado (RB/FB)
- 1980–1989: Mesa / Mesa State
- 1990–1997: Fort Hays State
- 2000–2001: Oklahoma Wranglers
- 2004: Grand Rapids Rampage

Head coaching record
- Overall: 133–60–6 (college); 91–22–2 (high school)
- Tournaments: 7–7 (NAIA D-I playoffs); 0–2 (NCAA D-II playoffs)

Accomplishments and honors

Championships
- 8 RMAC (1982–1983, 1985–1988, 1993, 1995)

Bob Cortese (born March 8, 1943) is an American former football player and coach. He served as the head football coach at Mesa State College—now known as Colorado Mesa University from 1980 to 1989 at Fort Hays State University from 1990 to 1997, compiling a career college football coaching record of 133–60–6. Cortese was also a head coach in the Arena Football League, with the Oklahoma Wranglers from 2000 to 2001 and the Grand Rapids Rampage in 2004.

== Head coaching record ==
=== College ===
Year	Team	Overall	Conference	Standing	Bowl/playoffs
Mesa / Mesa State Mavericks (Rocky Mountain Athletic Conference) (1980–1989)
1980	Mesa	3–6	3–5	T–5th	
1981	Mesa	7–3	6–2	T–2nd	
1982	Mesa	11–1–1	7–0–1	1st	L NAIA Championship
1983	Mesa	11–1–1	7–0–1	1st	L NAIA Championship
1984	Mesa	2–8	1–7	8th	
1985	Mesa	9–2	7–0	1st	L NAIA Division I Semifinal
1986	Mesa	7–3–1	6–0	1st	L NAIA Division I Quarterfinal
1987	Mesa	11–1	6–0	1st	L NAIA Division I Semifinal
1988	Mesa State	8–2	5–0	1st	L NAIA Division I First Round
1989	Mesa State	9–1	6–1	2nd	
Mesa / Mesa State:		78–28–2	54–15–2		
Fort Hays State Tigers (NAIA Division I independent) (1990)
1990	Fort Hays State	8–4			L NAIA Division I Quarterfinal
Fort Hays State Tigers (Rocky Mountain Athletic Conference) (1991–1997)
1991	Fort Hays State	8–3	4–2	2nd	
1992	Fort Hays State	6–5	6–1	2nd	
1993	Fort Hays State	8–4	6–1	1st	L NCAA Division II First Round
1994	Fort Hays State	5–5–1	5–1–1	2nd	
1995	Fort Hays State	8–2–2	6–0–1	T–1st	L NCAA Division II First Round
1996	Fort Hays State	7–3	5–3	T–3rd	
1997	Fort Hays State	5–6	4–4	5th	
Fort Hays State:		55–32–3	35–12–2		
Total:		133–60–6			
National championship Conference title Conference division title or championship game berth

=== Arena Football League ===
Team	Year	Regular season				Postseason			
Team	Year	Won	Lost	Win %	Finish	Won	Lost	Win %	Result
OKW	2000	7	7	.500	3rd in AC Western	1	1	.500	Lost to San Jose SaberCats in Conference Semifinals.
OKW	2001	5	9	.357	4th in AC Western	0	0	.000	–
OKW Total		12	16	.429	–	1	1	.500	
GRR	2004	1	7	.125	5th in AC Central	0	0	.000	–
GRR Total		1	7	.125	–	0	0	–	
Total		13	23	.361		1	1	.500	
