= Jim Gilstrap (coach) =

American gridiron football player and coach (1942–2007)

Biographical details
- Born: May 11, 1942; South Bend, Indiana, U.S.
- Died: July 19, 2007 (aged 65); Corvallis, Oregon, U.S.

Playing career
- 1961–1963: Western Michigan
- Position: Center

Coaching career (HC unless noted)
- 1964: Southern Illinois (DL)
- 1965–1966: Western Reserve (OL)
- 1967–1968: Edinboro State (DL)
- 1969–1974: Illinois State (OL)
- 1977: Kansas State (OL)
- 1978–1980: Western Michigan (OL)
- 1981–1983: Fort Hays State
- 1984: Saskatchewan Roughriders (DC)
- 1985–1986: Saskatchewan Roughriders (OL)
- 1987–1989: Toronto Argonauts (OB/WR)
- 1990: Winnipeg Blue Bombers (OL)
- 1991–1992: San Antonio Riders (OL)
- 1993: Toronto Argonauts (OL)
- 1995–1996: Ottawa Rough Riders
- 1996: Hamilton Tiger-Cats (OL)
- 1997–1998: Oregon State (assistant HC/OL)
- 1999: Linfield (assistant)
- 2000–2001: Tulsa (OC/RB)
- 2002: Southwest Mississippi (OC/QB/WR)
- 2003–2004: Oregon State (OL)
- 2005: Oregon State (RB)

Administrative career (AD unless noted)
- 1999: Linfield (assistant AD)

Head coaching record
- Overall: 20–11–1 (college); 3–17 (CFL)

Accomplishments and honors

Championships
- 78th Grey Cup

Jim Gilstrap (May 11, 1942 – July 19, 2007) was an American football and Canadian football coach. He had 42-year coaching career, including two as head coach of the Ottawa Rough Riders and ten as an assistant to Mike Riley.

== Career ==
Gilstrap began coaching in 1964 after graduating from Western Michigan University, coaching the defensive line at Southern Illinois University. From 1965 to 1966, he was the offensive line coach at Case Western. From 1967 to 1968, he was defensive line coach at Edinboro State. In 1969, he began a six-year tenure as Illinois State's offensive line coach. He then served as offensive line coach with the Kansas State Wildcats in 1977 and with the Western Michigan Broncos from 1978 to 1980.

From 1981 to 1983, Gilstrap was the head coach at Fort Hays State. He compiled a 20–11–1 record with the Tigers and ranks eighth on the wins list at FHSU. His .645 winning percentage is third best in school history among coaches to coach more than one season. His 1983 team, went 8–3, which ties for the most wins in a single season at FHSU. Gilstrap was also head wrestling coach at FHSU during the 1980–81 season.

He began coaching professionally in 1984 as a defensive coach with the Saskatchewan Roughriders of the Canadian Football League. From 1987 to 1989, he was the offensive backs and receivers coach with the Toronto Argonauts. In 1990 he was hired to coach the offensive line of the Winnipeg Blue Bombers under head coach Mike Riley. The team finished 12–6 and won the 78th Grey Cup.

He moved with Riley the following season to coach the WLAF's San Antonio Riders. In 1993 he followed Riley to the CFL's expansion San Antonio Texans. However, the team folded before the season started it when ran out of money.

In 1995 CFL season Gilstrap received his first and only professional head coaching position when he was hired by the Ottawa Rough Riders. The team finished 3–15 and missed the playoffs. He was fired the following season after a 0–2 start (and losing both preseason games). He finished the rest of the year as the Hamilton Tiger-Cats offensive line coach.

Starting in 1997 Gilstrap was OSU's offensive line coach and assistant head coach under Mike Riley. When Riley left for the San Diego Chargers. He moved to Linfield where he served as an assistant athletic director and assistant football coach during the 1999 season. In 2000, he moved to Tulsa as coach Keith Burns' offensive coordinator and running backs coach. He spent the 2002 season as offensive coordinator and quarterbacks/wide receivers coach at Southwest Mississippi Community College. In 2003, he returned to OSU, once again as Mike Riley's offensive line coach. During his second tenure he also served as running backs coach and as coordinator of support services. While at Oregon State, Gilstrap coached postseason honors recipients Yvenson Bernard, Doug Nienhuis, Adam Koets, Roy Schuening, and Aaron Koch.

== Head coaching record ==
=== College ===
Year	Team	Overall	Conference	Standing	Bowl/playoffs
Fort Hays State Tigers (Central States Intercollegiate Conference) (1981–1983)
1981	Fort Hays State	6–5	3–4	T–4th	
1982	Fort Hays State	6–3–1	4–2–1	4th	
1983	Fort Hays State	8–3	4–3	T–3rd	
Fort Hays State:		20–11–1	11–9–1		
Total:		20–11–1			

=== CFL ===
Team	Year	Regular season					Postseason		
Team	Year	Won	Lost	Ties	Win %	Finish	Won	Lost	Result
OTT	1995	3	15	0	.167	Last in North Division	Did not qualify		
OTT	1996	0	2	0	.000	Last in East Division	Fired before end of season		
Total		3	17	0	.150		0	0	
