= W. C. Riley =

American football coach, administrator, and teacher (1903–1954)

- Riley pictured in Reveille 1931, Fort Hays yearbook

Biographical details
- Born: January 4, 1903; Scott City, Kansas, U.S.
- Died: April 30, 1954 (aged 51); Pottstown, Pennsylvania, U.S.

Coaching career (HC unless noted)
- 1930–1934: Fort Hays State

Head coaching record
- Overall: 21–19–6

Accomplishments and honors

Championships
- 1 CIC (1934)

Wilbur Clifford "Jack" Riley (January 4, 1903 – April 30, 1954) was an American football coach, athletic administrator, and teacher.

Riley was born in Scott City, Kansas, in 1903. He attended Kansas State Teachers College of Hays located in Hays, Kansas, where he received varsity letters in both football and basketball. He also played varsity baseball at Hays.

After graduating from college, Riley coached high school football in Oberlin, Kansas for five years from 1925 to 1929.

In 1930, he became the eighth head football coach at Kansas State Teachers College of Hays. He held that position for five seasons, from 1930 until 1934. His career coaching record at Hays was 21–19–6. His 1934 football team won the Central Intercollegiate Athletic Conference (CIAC) championship with a 6–2–1 record. He was also the athletic director while at Hays. The school's name was changed to Fort Hays State College in 1931.

In September 1935, Riley joined the faculty of The Hill School in Pottstown, Pennsylvania, where he served at various times as football and baseball coach, athletic director, and an instructor in history and Bible. In November 1952, Riley suffered a heart attack while coaching a football game. He retired from athletic duties after suffering the heart attack, but remained at The Hill School as an instructor. He died in 1954 upon suffering his second heart attack in 16 months.

== Head coaching record ==
Year	Team	Overall	Conference	Standing	Bowl/playoffs
Fort Hays State Tigers (Central Intercollegiate Conference) (1930–1934)
1930	Fort Hays State	2–5–2	1–4–1	T–5th	
1931	Fort Hays State	3–5–1	1–4–1	T–5th	
1932	Fort Hays State	4–5	2–4	T–5th	
1933	Fort Hays State	6–2–2	3–1–2	2nd	
1934	Fort Hays State	6–2–1	4–1	1st	
Fort Hays State:		21–19–6	11–14–4		
Total:		21–19–6			
National championship Conference title Conference division title or championship game berth
