= John Vincent (American football) =

American football coach

Coaching career (HC unless noted)
- ?–1984: Fort Hays State (DC)
- 1985–1989: Fort Hays State

Head coaching record
- Overall: 22–26–2

John Vincent is an American former football coach. He was the 18th head football coach at Fort Hays State University in Hays, Kansas, serving for five seasons, from 1985 to 1989, and compiling a record of 22–26–2.

== Head coaching record ==
Year	Team	Overall	Conference	Standing	Bowl/playoffs
Fort Hays State Tigers (Central States Intercollegiate Conference) (1985–1989)
1985	Fort Hays State	7–2–1	5–2	2nd	
1986	Fort Hays State	4–6	2–5	T–5th	
1987	Fort Hays State	5–5	4–3	4th	
1988	Fort Hays State	3–6–1	3–4	5th	
1989	Fort Hays State	3–7	2–1	2nd	
Fort Hays State:		22–26–2	16–15		
Total:		22–26–2			
