= Paul D. Waldorf =

American football and basketball coach (1908–1980)

Biographical details
- Born: January 13, 1908; New York, New York, U.S.
- Died: January 30, 1980 (aged 72); Mankato, Minnesota, U.S.

Playing career

Football
- c. 1927: Baker

Coaching career (HC unless noted)

Football
- c. 1932: Wentworth Military (IL)
- 1933–1935: McKendree
- 1936–1941: Fort Hays State

Basketball
- 1933–1934: McKendree
- 1935–1936: McKendree

Head coaching record
- Overall: 40–32–9 (college football); 20–21 (college basketball)

Accomplishments and honors

Championships
- Football; 1 CIC (1936)

Paul Douglas Waldorf (January 13, 1908 – January 30, 1980) was an American football and basketball coach. He served as the head football coach at McKendree College—now known as McKendree University—in Lebanon, Illinois from 1933 to 1935 and at Fort Hays State University in Hays, Kansas from 1936 to 1941. Waldorf compiled a career college football coaching record of 40–32–9. Waldorf was also the head basketball coach at McKendree for two seasons, in 1933–34 and 1935–36, tallying a mark of 20–21. He was a brother of the college football coaches Pappy Waldorf, John D. Waldorf, and Bob Waldorf, as well as the son of Methodist Episcopal Church bishop, Ernest Lynn Waldorf.

== Head coaching record ==
=== College football ===
| Year | Team | Overall | Conference | Standing | Bowl/playoffs |
|---|---|---|---|---|---|
McKendree Bearcats (Illinois Intercollegiate Athletic Conference) (1933–1935)
| 1933 | McKendree | 6–3 | 4–1 | T–5th | |
| 1934 | McKendree | 4–5 | 1–4 | T–14th | |
| 1935 | McKendree | 5–3–1 | 4–1–1 | T–5th | |
| McKendree: | | 15–11–1 | 9–6–1 | | |
Fort Hays State Tigers (Central Intercollegiate Conference) (1936–1941)
| 1936 | Fort Hays State | 6–3 | 4–0 | 1st | |
| 1937 | Fort Hays State | 6–2–1 | 2–2 | 3rd | |
| 1938 | Fort Hays State | 7–2 | 3–1 | 2nd | |
| 1939 | Fort Hays State | 2–5–2 | 1–3–1 | 5th | |
| 1940 | Fort Hays State | 3–3–3 | 1–3 | T–3rd | |
| 1941 | Fort Hays State | 1–6–2 | 0–4 | 5th | |
| Fort Hays State: | | 25–21–8 | 11–13–1 | | |
| Total: | | 40–32–9 | | | |
National championship Conference title Conference division title or championship game berth
