= Fort Hays State Tigers football =

College football team in Kansas

- First season: 1902; 124 years ago
- Athletic director: Lisa Goddard McGuirk
- Head coach: Chris Brown; 12th season, 81–55 (.596)
- Location: Hays, Kansas
- Stadium: Lewis Field Stadium (capacity: 6,362)
- NCAA division: Division II
- Conference: The MIAA
- Colors: Black and gold
- All-time record: 455–495–55 (.480)

Conference championships
- 11
- Rivalries: Nebraska–Kearney (main); Emporia State
- Fight song: Go! You Hays Tigers!
- Mascot: Victor E. Tiger
- Marching band: Tiger Marching Band
- Outfitter: Adidas
- Website: www.fhsuathletics.com

The Fort Hays State Tigers football program represents Fort Hays State University in college football. They participate in Division II sports within the NCAA in the Mid-America Intercollegiate Athletics Association (MIAA). The team plays their home games in Lewis Field Stadium, located on the Fort Hays State University campus in Hays, Kansas.

Fort Hays State's football program dates back to 1902. The Tigers have claimed 11 conference championships, including a recent MIAA conference championship in the 2017 season.

== Seasons ==
=== Chris Brown era ===
| Year | Coach | Overall | Conference | Standing | Bowl/playoffs | Coaches^{#} | AP^{°} |
|---|---|---|---|---|---|---|---|
Chris Brown (Mid-America Intercollegiate Athletics Association) (2011–present)
| 2011 | Chris Brown | 4–7 | 3–6 | T–6th | | | |
| 2012 | Chris Brown | 5–6 | 4–6 | T–9th | | | |
| 2013 | Chris Brown | 6–5 | 4–5 | 8th | | | |
| 2014 | Chris Brown | 7–4 | 7–4 | T–4th | | | |
| 2015 | Chris Brown | 8–4 | 8–3 | T–3rd | L Mineral Water Bowl | | |
| 2016 | Chris Brown | 8–4 | 7–4 | T–4th | W Heart of Texas Bowl | | |
| 2017 | Chris Brown | 11–1 | 11–0 | 1st | NCAA Playoffs second round | | |
| Chris Brown: | | 49–31 | 45–27 | | | | |
| Total: | | 49–31 | | | | | |
National championship Conference title Conference division title or championship game berth
^{#}Rankings from final Coaches Poll.

== Championships ==
=== Conference championships ===
| Year | Conference | Coach | Overall Record | Conference Record |
|---|---|---|---|---|
| 1917 | Kansas Conference | W.G. Speer | 7–0–0 | 6–0–0 |
| 1921 | Kansas Conference | George Woodward | 6–1–0 | 6–0–0 |
| 1934 | Central Intercollegiate Conference | Jack Riley | 6–2–1 | 4–1–0 |
| 1935^{†} | Central Intercollegiate Conference | James J. Yeager | 8–2–0 | 3–1–0 |
| 1936 | Central Intercollegiate Conference | Paul D. Waldorf | 6–3–0 | 4–0–0 |
| 1954^{†} | Central Intercollegiate Conference | Ralph Huffman | 7–2–0 | 4–1–0 |
| 1966^{†} | Central Intercollegiate Conference | Wayne McConnell | 7–2–0 | 3–1–0 |
| 1976^{†} | Central Intercollegiate Conference | Bill Giles | 5–4–0 | 5–1–0 |
| 1993 | Rocky Mountain Athletic Conference | Bob Cortese | 8–4–0 | 6–1–0 |
| 1995^{†} | Rocky Mountain Athletic Conference | Bob Cortese | 8–2–2 | 6–0–1 |
| 2017 | Mid-America Intercollegiate Athletics Association | Chris Brown | 11–0 | 11–0 |
| Total Conference championships: | | | 11 | |
† Denotes co-champions

== Playoff appearances ==
=== NCAA Division II ===
The Tigers have made four appearances in the NCAA Division II playoffs, with a combined record of 0–4.

| Year | Round | Opponent | Result |
|---|---|---|---|
| 1993 | First round | UC Davis | L, 34–37 |
| 1995 | First round | Texas A&M–Kingsville | L, 28–59 |
| 2017 | Regional semifinal | Ferris State | L, 21–31 |
| 2018 | First round | Indianapolis | L, 27–38 |

=== NAIA Division I ===
Fort Hays State made one appearance in the NAIA Division I playoffs, with a record of 0–1.

| Year | Round | Opponent | Result |
|---|---|---|---|
| 1990 | Quarterfinals | Central State (OH) | L, 10–48 |

== All-time record vs. current MIAA teams ==
Official record (including any NCAA imposed vacates and forfeits) against all current MIAA opponents as of the end of the 2018 season:

| Opponent | Won | Lost | Tied | Percentage | Streak | First Meeting |
|---|---|---|---|---|---|---|
| Central Missouri | 6 | 10 | 0 | .375 | Won 2 | 1964 |
| Central Oklahoma | 7 | 7 | 0 | .500 | Won 4 | 1955 |
| Emporia State | 36 | 55 | 2 | .398 | Lost 1 | 1923 |
| Lindenwood | 6 | 1 | 0 | .800 | Won 6 | 2012 |
| Missouri Southern | 17 | 13 | 1 | .565 | Won 6 | 1970 |
| Missouri Western | 13 | 15 | 1 | .466 | Lost 1 | 1976 |
| Nebraska–Kearney | 31 | 34 | 1 | .477 | Won 7 | 1926 |
| Northeastern State | 6 | 2 | 0 | .750 | Won 6 | 1989 |
| Northwest Missouri State | 14 | 19 | 1 | .426 | Won 2 | 1950 |
| Pittsburg State | 22 | 46 | 9 | .344 | Won 3 | 1925 |
| Washburn | 26 | 45 | 3 | .372 | Won 2 | 1919 |
| Totals | 184 | 247 | 13 | .429 | | |

== Stadium ==
The Tigers have played their home games in Lewis Field Stadium since 1936.
