= Heinrich Funck =

Mennonite bishop (died 1760)

- Bishop of the Salford and Franconia Mennonite Congregations
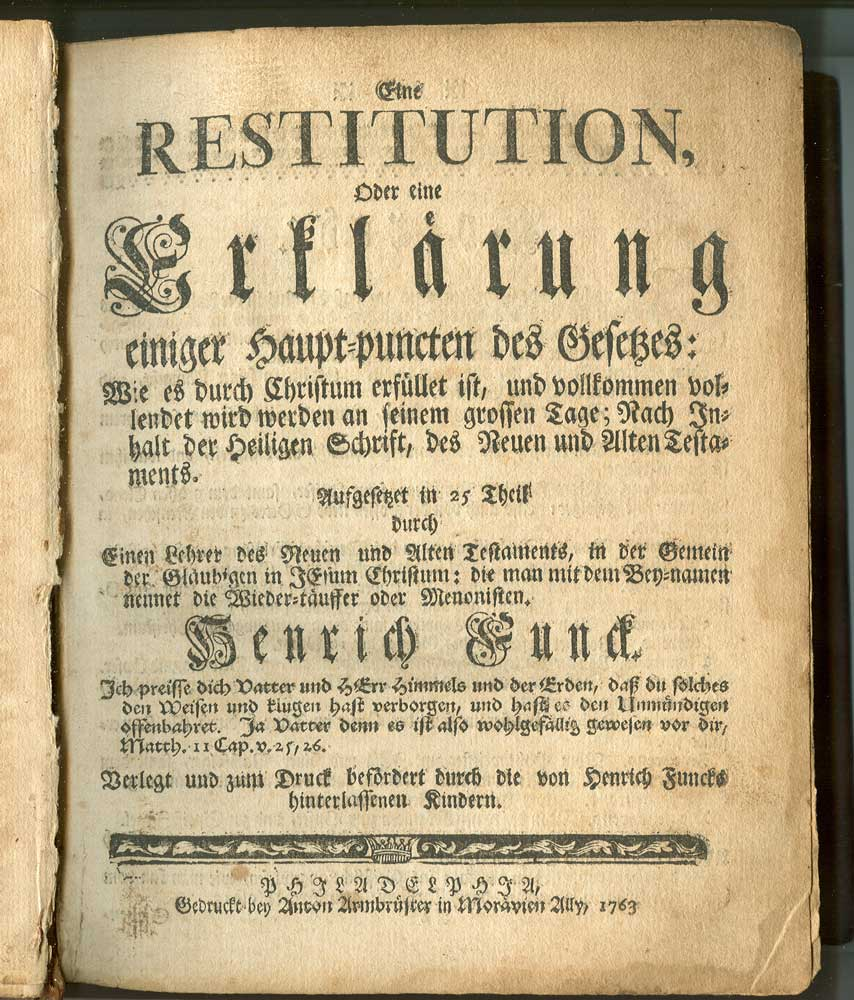
- First page of "Eine Restitution, Oder eine Erklaerung einiger Haupt-puncten des Gesetzes," authored by Heinrich Funck.
- Installed: Before 1738
- Term ended: 1760
- Successor: Isaac Kolb
- Previous posts: Minister of the Salford and Franconia Mennonite Congregations

Personal details
- Born: Palatinate, Holy Roman Empire
- Died: 1760 Montgomery County, Pennsylvania
- Buried: Delp Burying Ground, Harleysville, Pennsylvania
- Denomination: Mennonite Church
- Residence: Franconia Township, Pennsylvania
- Spouse: Anne Meyer
- Children: 10
- Occupation: Miller, Mennonite preacher, and author

Heinrich Funck (died 1760), also known as Henry Funk, was a Palatine-born mill operator, Mennonite preacher, religious author, and an early bishop in the Franconia Mennonite Conference in America.

Commonly believed to have been born in the Palatinate region of Germany, Heinrich Funck immigrated to the United States with his family in 1717, settling in Franconia Township, Pennsylvania in 1719. He owned several properties there and in the area. In 1725, he constructed a grist mill in Franconia. He became a Mennonite minister and, by 1738, a bishop of the Salford and Franconia Mennonite Congregations in the Franconia Mennonite Conference. Based in Franconia, he preached throughout the area. He supervised the translation of Martyrs Mirror into the German language from 1745 to 1748, and authored two original religious works, Ein Spiegel der Taufe (A Mirror of Baptism), published in 1744, and Eine Restitution, Oder eine Erklaerung einiger Haupt-puncten des Gesetzes (Restitution, or an Explanation of Several Principal Points of the Law), published posthumously by his children in 1763.

Heinrich Funck was the father of ten children, including Christian Funk, the leader of the Funkite schism, and was the grandfather of musician Joseph Funk. Heinrich Funck died in 1760 in Montgomery County, Pennsylvania, and was buried in the Delp Burying Ground in Harleysville, Pennsylvania.

== Biography ==
Heinrich Funck is commonly believed to have been born in the Palatinate region of Germany. No baptismal record is known. He was a descendant of Swiss Mennonites who were expelled from Bern, Switzerland, in the 17th century based largely on their religious beliefs. Funck arrived in Philadelphia in 1717 with his family and other German Palatines, seeking a place to freely practice their Mennonite faith, including Dielman Kolb, who became an early Mennonite minister in Pennsylvania.

In 1719, Funck settled in Franconia Township, Montgomery County, Pennsylvania, having purchased three tracts of land there totaling 201 acres. He also owned a 166-acre farm located in Hilltown Township in Bucks County, as well as another tract containing buildings. In 1725, he built a grist mill on Indian Creek in Franconia Township in what is today Telford, Pennsylvania.

Funck became the first minister of the Mennonite congregation at Franconia, and by 1738 had become bishop of the Salford and Franconia Mennonite Congregations in the Franconia Mennonite Conference. In that year, Funck, together with others including Dielman Kolb and his father-in-law Christian Meyer, was instrumental in purchasing land for the Salford Mennonite meeting house, the congregation of which dated to 1717. In addition to preaching in Franconia and Salford, Funck preached in Skippack, Hatfield, and Towamencin, among other places.

From 1745 to 1748, together with Dielman Kolb, he supervised the translation of the classic 1660 Dutch religious history Martyrs Mirror into the German language. Funck also wrote two German-language religious books: Ein Spiegel der Taufe (A Mirror of Baptism), published in 1744, and Eine Restitution, Oder eine Erklaerung einiger Haupt-puncten des Gesetzes (Restitution, or an Explanation of Several Principal Points of the Law), published posthumously by his children in 1763. While Ein Spiegel der Taufe focuses on baptism of the Holy Spirit, baptism with water, and baptism of the passion of Jesus Christ, Eine Restitution, Oder eine Erklaerung einiger Haupt-puncten des Gesetzes provides an explanation of Old Testament law and its fulfillment by Christ.

Heinrich Funck died in 1760 and was buried in the Delp Burying Ground in Harleysville, Pennsylvania. A memorial gravestone there lists him as Henry Funk.

== Personal life ==
Funck married Anne Meyer, daughter of Mennonite immigrant Christian Meyer. They were the parents of ten children, one of whom was Christian Funk, leader of the Funkite schism. Heinrich Funck was the grandfather of musician Joseph Funk and of Jacob Funk, who was the original owner of the historic Jacob Funk House and Barn.

== See also ==
- Funkite

== Works ==
- Ein Spiegel der Taufe (1744)
- Eine Restitution, Oder eine Erklaerung einiger Haupt-puncten des Gesetzes (1763; published posthumously)

== Other sources ==
- Boldt, Andrea; Werner Enninger, Delbert L. Gratz (1997) Mennonites in Transition From Switzerland to America (Masthof Press) ISBN 9781883294472
- Kasdorf, Julia Spicher (2009) The Body and the Book: Writing from a Mennonite Life: Essays and Poems (Penn State Press) ISBN 9780271035444
- Ruth, John L. (1984) Maintaining the Right Fellowship: a narrative account of life in the oldest Mennonite community in North America (Franconia Mennonite Conference) ISBN 1-59244-788-0
- Wenger, John Christian (1937) History of the Mennonites of the Franconia Conference (Franconia Mennonite Historical Society) LCCN 38-31215
