= Augsburger (disambiguation) =

Augsburger may refer to:

== People with the surname ==
- David Augsburger, American Anabaptist author
- Gaetan Augsburger (born 1988), Swiss ice hockey player
- John Augsburger (born 1940), American former politician from the state of Indiana
- Myron Augsburger (born 1929), American Mennonite pastor, professor, theologian, and author

== Other uses ==
- Augsburg, a city in Swabia, Bavaria, Germany
- Augsburger, an endangered German breed of domestic chicken, originating in Augsburg
- Augsburger Schrift, a blackletter typeface by Art Nouveau illustrator Peter Schnorr.

== See also ==
- Augsburger Allgemeine, major German regional daily newspaper
- Augsburger Interim, imperial decree ordered on 15 May 1548 by Charles V, Holy Roman Emperor
- Der Augsburger Kreidekreis, short story written in 1940 by Bertolt Brecht
- Augsburger Panther, professional ice hockey team
- Augsburger Puppenkiste, marionette theater in Augsburg
- Ralphi – Der Schlaubär aus der Augsburger Puppenkiste, German television series
- Augsburger Rathaus, Augsburg Town Hall
- Augsburger Religionsfrieden, a 1555 treaty between Charles V, Holy Roman Emperor and the Schmalkaldic League
- Augsburger Straße station, station on the U3 line
