= Alan Kreider =

American Mennonite historian

- Born: November, 1941; Goshen, Indiana, United States
- Died: May 8, 2017; Goshen, Indiana, United States
- Spouse: Eleanor Kreider

Alan Kreider (November 1941 - 8 May 2017) was an American Mennonite historian. He was the American Professor Emeritus of Church History and Mission at the Anabaptist Mennonite Biblical Seminary in Elkhart, Indiana. His main interests were mission, worship, peace, and ecclesiastical history (especially the early church and Anabaptism). Kreider continued to speak, write and publish in these areas of interest until his death in May 2017.

== Education ==
Kreider was educated at Goshen College, Indiana (BA 1962), Princeton University (1962–63), Heidelberg University (1963–64), Harvard University (AM 1965) (PhD 1971), and the University of London (1966–68). He has been the recipient of a Danforth Fellowship (1962–68), a Harvard Travelling Fellowship (1966–67), and an American Council of Learned Societies Fellowship (1972–74). In 1995 he was accorded the status of Master of Arts in the University of Oxford and his name was added to the Register of Congregation.

== Appointments ==
=== Goshen College ===
Kreider was Assistant and associate professor of history at Goshen College 1968-1983.

=== London ===
He spent 1974-2000 in England as a missionary with the Mennonite Board of Missions. He was warden and director of the London Mennonite Centre 1974-1991 and elder of Wood Green Mennonite Church, London 1975-1991. In 1979 he became an adjunct lecturer in Church history at London Bible College, where he remained until 1983.

=== Manchester ===
He spent 1991-95 in Manchester as an adjunct lecturer in Church history at the University of Manchester and as theologian in residence at the Northern Baptist College. During this period he was also a visiting lecturer at the Eastern Mennonite Seminary (1991) and at the Bible College of New Zealand (1993). In 1993 he became book review editor for Anabaptism Today and continued to serve in that role until 2000.

=== Oxford ===
In 1995 he moved to Oxford, where he remained until 2000, as both director of the Centre for the Study of Christianity and Culture at Regent’s Park College and a member of the Oxford University Theology Faculty.

=== Anabaptist Mennonite Biblical Seminary ===
Kreider served as an adjunct faculty member of Anabaptist Mennonite Biblical Seminary beginning in 1997. He was named Associate Professor of Church History and Mission in 2004 and became Professor of Church History and Mission in 2008. He retired from teaching in 2011.

== Other activities ==
As a public speaker, Kreider has taken part in a debate on the arms race with Marshal of the Royal Air Force The Lord Cameron of Balhousie as part of the London Lectures on Contemporary Christianity at All Souls Church, Langham Place (1982) and with Lord Trefgarne, Edward Leigh MP, and Canon Paul Oestreicher, at the Cambridge Union Society (1983). In 1997 he, with his wife Eleanor, preached at the Mennonite World Conference in Calcutta and in 2001 they delivered three speeches in Japan to commemorate the fiftieth anniversary of the Japanese Mennonite Church.

Kreider (sometimes with his wife, Eleanor) has given the Staley Lectures at Goshen College (1987 and 2001), the Laing Lecture at London Bible College (1994), the Tyndale Christian Doctrine Lecture at the Tyndale Fellowship, Cambridge (1996), the Schrag Lectures and Sider Peace Lectures at Messiah College, Pennsylvania (2001, 2007), the Menno Simons Lectures at Bethel College, Kansas (2001), the Believers Church Lectures at Fresno Pacific University, California, (2002), the Athol Gill Memorial Lecture at Whitley College, Melbourne, Australia (2005), the Annual Lecture at the Macquarie Christian Studies Institute, Sydney (2005), and the Augsburger Mission Lectures at Eastern Mennonite University (2012). He has spoken at the Wheaton College (Illinois) Theology Conference (2007), the Calvin Theological Seminary Symposium on Worship (2011), Tyndale University College and Seminary and Wycliffe College, Toronto (2011). He has been Senior Mission Scholar in Residence at the Overseas Ministries Study Center, New Haven, Connecticut (2005).

Kreider has been a member of the Shaftesbury Project on Christian Involvement in Society (1978-1983), Evangelical Peacemakers (1983-1992), the Missiology of Western Culture Project History Group (1992–97), and the Mennonite-Roman Catholic International Dialogue (2000). He was a founder of the Anabaptist Network (UK) and was a member of its Steering Group (1991-2000).

== Works ==
Kreider's publications include:

- English Chantries: The Road to Dissolution (Cambridge, Mass; London: Harvard University Press, 1979; reprinted Eugene, Oregon: Wipf & Stock, 2012) - North American Conference on British Studies, Jon Ben Snow Prize, Honorable Mention (1980)
- Jean Michel Hornus, It Is Not Lawful For Me to Fight: Early Christian Attitudes Toward War, Violence, and the State (translated with Oliver Coburn) (Scottdale, Pa.: Herald Press, 1980)
- Journey Towards Holiness: A Way of Living for God's People (Basingstoke: Marshall Pickering, 1986; Scottdale, Pa.: Herald Press, 1987) - The Other Side Magazine Book of the Year (1987); Silver Angel Award for Religion in Media (1987); translated into Japanese (2001)
- Handling Problems of Peace and War: An Evangelical Debate (with John Stott and Jerram Barrs, ed. J. Andrew Kirk) (Basingstoke: Marshall Pickering, 1988)
- 'Abolishing the Laity: An Anabaptist Perspective on Ordination,' in Paul Beasley-Murray, ed., Anyone for Ordination? (Tunbridge Wells: Monarch, 1993), 84-111
- Worship and Evangelism in Pre-Christendom (Cambridge: Grove Books, 1995); translated into Korean (2003)
- Culture and the Nonconformist tradition (edited with Jane Shaw) (Cardiff: University of Wales Press, 1999)
- The Change of Conversion and the Origin of Christendom (Harrisburg, Pa.: Trinity Press International, 1999; reprinted Eugene, Ore.: Wipf & Stock, 2006)
- Becoming a Peace Church (with Eleanor Kreider) (London: New Ground published in association with HHSC Christian Press, 2000); translated into Korean (2003)
- Coming Home: Stories of Anabaptists in Britain and Ireland (edited with Stuart Murray) (Waterloo, Ont.: Pandora Press, 2000)
- Christianity and the Culture of Economics (edited with Donald A. Hay) (Cardiff: University of Wales Press, 2001)
- The Origins of Christendom in the West (ed. and contributor) (Edinburgh; New York: T&T Clark, 2001)
- Composing music for worship (edited with Stephen Darlington) (Norwich: Canterbury Press, 2003)
- 'Military Service in the Church Orders', in Journal of Religious Ethics vol. 31, no. 3 (2003), 415-442
- 'Peacemaking in Worship in the Syrian Church Orders', in Studia Liturgica (2004), 177-190
- A Culture of Peace: God’s Vision for the Church (with Eleanor Kreider and Paulus Widjaja) (Intercourse, Pa.: Good Books, 2005); translated into German (2008); translated into Hindi (2013)
- 'Beyond Bosch: The Early Church and the Christendom Shift', Mission Focus Annual Review 11, Supplement (2003), 158-177; also International Bulletin of Missionary Research vol. 29, no. 2 (2005), 59-68
- 'Baptism and Catechesis as Spiritual Formation,' in Andrew Walker and Luke Bretherton, eds., Remembering Our Future: Explorations in Deep Church (Milton Keynes: Paternoster Press, 2007), 170-206
- 'Violence and Mission in the Fourth and Fifth Centuries: Lessons for Today,' International Bulletin of Missionary Research vol. 31, no. 3 (2007), 125-133
- 'They alone know the right way to live: The Early Church and Evangelism,'in Mark Husbands and Jeffrey P. Greenman, eds., Ancient Faith for the Church's Future (Downers Grove, IL: InterVarsity Press, 2008), 169-186.
- Social Holiness: A Way of Living for God’s Nation (foreword by Dale M. Coulter, a new edition of Journey Towards Holiness) (Eugene, OR: Wipf and Stock, 2008)
- Resident But Alien: How the Early Church Grew (6 DVD presentations on 2 discs) (Harpenden, Herts, UK: Great Commission Distribution Ltd, 2009; Seattle, WA: YWAM Resources, 2009)
- Worship and Mission After Christendom (with Eleanor Kreider) (Milton Keynes, UK: Paternoster Press, 2009; Scottdale, PA: Herald Press, 2011); translated into Japanese (2015)
- 'Converted but Not Baptized: Peter Leithart’s Constantine Project,' Mennonite Quarterly Review vol. 85, no. 4 (2011), 573-615; in John. D. Roth, ed., Constantine Revisited: Leithart, Yoder, and the Constantinian Debate (Eugene, OR: Pickwick Press, 2013), 25-67
- 'Mission and Violence: Inculturation in the Fourth Century – Basil and Ambrose,' in John Corrie and Cathy Ross, eds., Mission in Context: Explorations Inspired by J. Andrew Kirk (Abingdon: Ashgate, 2012), 201-216
- Catéchèse, baptême et mission: Leçons d’hier pour L’́Êglise aujourd’hui. Textes rassemblés par Michel Sommer (Charols, France: Éditions Excelsis, 2013)
- 'The Significance of the Mennonite-Catholic Dialogue: A Mennonite Perspective,' in Gerald W. Schlabach and Margaret Pfeil, eds., Sharing Peace: Mennonites and Catholics in Conversation (Collegeville, MN: Liturgical Press, 2013), 20-31
- The Patient Ferment of the Early Church: The Improbable Rise of Christianity in the Roman Empire (Grand Rapids: Baker Academic, 2016)
