= Myron Augsburger =

American evangelist (1929–2026)

- Born: Myron Shenk Augsburger; August 20, 1929; Elida, Ohio, U.S.
- Died: October 15, 2026 (aged 97)
- Education: Eastern Mennonite College (Junior College Bible Diploma, 1950; AB, 1955); Eastern Mennonite Seminary (ThB, 1958); Goshen Biblical Seminary (MDiv, 1959); Union Presbyterian Seminary (ThM, 1961); Union Presbyterian Seminary (ThD/PhD, 1964)
- Occupations: Speaker, evangelist, professor of theology
- Known for: President of Eastern Mennonite College

Myron Shenk Augsburger (August 20, 1929 – October 15, 2026) was an American Mennonite pastor, academic, theologian and author. He was the president of both Eastern Mennonite College (now known as Eastern Mennonite University) and the Council for Christian Colleges and Universities.

== Early life ==
Myron Shenk Augsburger was born in Elida, Ohio, on August 20, 1929. He was one of six children, Fred, Donald, Anna Mary, Daniel and David, born to Clarence and Estella Augsburger. On November 28, 1950, he married Esther L. Kniss (creator of Guns into Plowshares) in Elida, Ohio. They had three children, John Myron, Michael David, and Marcia Louise.

== Education ==
Augsburger received his Junior College Bible Diploma (1950) from Eastern Mennonite College (EMC) after which he began as pastor for Tuttle Avenue Mennonite Church in Sarasota, Florida. He returned to Harrisonburg, Virginia, in 1953 to continue his studies and serve as a part-time campus pastor at EMC. He received his AB (1955), and ThB (1958), from EMC. After leaving EMC he completed a Masters of Divinity from Goshen Biblical Seminary, in Goshen, Indiana, in 1959. Returning to Virginia for his studies he finished his master's degree in theology (1961) and Doctorate in Theology and Ph.D. (1964) at Union Presbyterian Seminary in Richmond, Virginia, while serving as a pastor at National Heights Mennonite Church. Augsburger continued his education in postgraduate positions at George Washington University in Washington, D.C., in 1964, at the University of Michigan, in Ann Arbor, Michigan in 1965, the University of Basel, Switzerland in 1974, and Mansfield College, Oxford University, England in 1980. He was also a scholar in residence at Princeton Seminary during 1980–81.

== Early career ==
During the years 1955–1961, while he was pursuing various degrees, he worked as an evangelist for Christian Layman's Tent Evangelism (CLTE). CLTE was a Mennonite evangelical organization founded in Kidron, Ohio, in the early 1950s and in operation until the early 1960s. Augsburger continued to serve as an evangelist and speaker to large crowds throughout his career including: Staley Distinguished Christian Scholar, in Staley Foundation Lectures, for over 60 campuses, serving the Evangelical Fellowship of India in Conventions across India in 1964, 1969, 1973, speaker at the MarThoma Convention, Kerala, South India, February 2008.

In 1961 Augsburger attended the first National Christian Leadership Breakfast with President Dwight D. Eisenhower. In 1961 Augsburger took a position as an evangelist with InterChurch, Inc., where he preached and ran city-wide meetings intermittently until 1996, at times drawing in as many as 7,000 people.

== Mid-career ==
Starting in 1963, Augsburger began his professorial career at Eastern Mennonite College as Professor of Theology. In 1965, at age 35, he was named the fifth president of Eastern Mennonite College & Seminary, serving from 1965 to 1980. He continued to teach Theology during his tenure as college president. Shortly thereafter, in 1966, he received the first of his 10 honorary doctorates, at Houghton College.

In 1969, Augsburger was named one of the five most influential "preachers of an active gospel" by Time magazine. The magazine noted that he was a "dedicated integrationist and pacifist". That same year Augsburger founded the Mennonite Christian Leadership Foundation which was later integrated with the organization Global Disciples in 2000.

In 1971, Augsburger joined with other college presidents to found the Christian College Consortium. In 1976, he also participated in the founding of the Council for Christian Colleges and Universities, an organization he would later go on to become president of.

In 1980, Augsburger left EMC after a fifteen-year presidency. His time was marked by the completion of a new library and science center, as well as an increased profile for the university.

As a well-known evangelist, Myron had the vision and stature to guide EMC from being a rather insular school – one that lacked art, instrumental music, drama and intercollegiate athletics – to rapidly growing into a national player among Christian liberal arts colleges. - Phil Helmuth EMU’s executive director of development

== Later career ==
After leaving the EMC presidency in 1980 Augsburger moved to New Jersey to become a scholar in residence at Princeton Theological Seminary. In the spring of 1981, Myron and Esther Augsburger were asked by the Mennonite Board of Missions to start a church in Washington, DC. The a church they founded on Capitol Hill, Washington Community Fellowship, continues to this day. Augsburger remained on the pastoral staff there until 1987.

In September 1987 the Augsburgers spent a semester at Union Biblical Seminary in Pune, India. During their time there Myron taught courses and Esther (a renowned artist) built a nine-foot sculpture of Jesus washing Peter's feet. During this time he also began his work as Moderator of the General Assembly of the General Conference Mennonite Church (now known as Mennonite Church USA), which he held for two years.

In May 1988 Augsburger became president of the Council for Christian Colleges and Universities (CCCU). During his time at CCCU the coalition sponsored the Through the Eyes of Faith books and conferences on a variety of topics, opened the Los Angeles Film Studies Center, and partnered with the Centre of Medieval and Renaissance Studies in Oxford, among other things. His tenure was characterized by a focus on racial and ethnic diversity. This global focus and concentration on social justice issues and peace theology caused some coalition college presidents to question whether he was pulling the coalition to the left. Augsburger served as president of the CCCU until 1994.

During his tenure as president of the CCCU Augsburger advocated for a focus on Russia and led a team to Moscow to give lectures. Later, he returned to Russia to work with other evangelical leaders on developing the Russian American Christian University (opened in 1995), now known as the Russian American Institute.

During this period Augsburger was a visiting or adjunct professor at a variety of institutions, notably: Eastern Mennonite Seminary, Harrisonburg, Virginia; Associated Mennonite Biblical Seminary, Elkhart, Indiana (currently known as Anabaptist Mennonite Biblical Seminary; Union Biblical Seminary, Pune, India; Messerite Christian College, Addis Abba, Ethiopia; and Evangelical Theological Seminary, Osijek, Croatia.

Augsburger continued to write books and to work in various positions of education and ministry. He also served on a number of boards, including the board of reference for Christians for Biblical Equality and their publication Priscilla Papers, the Evangelical Environmental Network, Evangelicals for Social Action, Call for Renewal, and others.

== Death ==
Augsburger died on October 15, 2026, at the age of 97.

== Books authored ==
- Called to Maturity, Herald Press (1960), ASIN: B000MQ6V2I
- Plus Living, Zondervan (1963), ASIN: B000UT7SV0
- Invitation to Discipleship: The Message of Evangelism, Herald Press; Second Edition (1967), ASIN: B000M9QGE8
- Faith for a Secular World (reprint, When Reason Fails), Word Books; First Edition (1968), ASIN: B00005VV66
- The Broken Chalice (a historical novel), Herald Press (June 1971), ISBN 0836116518
- The Expanded Life (on the Sermon on the Mount), Abingdon Press (1972), ISBN 0687124190
- Quench Not the Spirit, Herald Press; rev. edition (1975), ISBN 0836114779
- Principles of Biblical Interpretation in Mennonite Theology, Herald Press (1975), ISBN 0836115465
- Walking in the Resurrection, Herald Press (1976), ISBN 0836113330
- Faithful Unto Death (historical stories of 16th-century youth), Word Books (1978), ISBN 0849900670
- Practicing the Presence of the Spirit, Herald Press (1982), ISBN 0836119908
- Evangelism as Discipling, Mennonite Faith Series (Book 12), Herald Press (August 1983), ISBN 0836133226
- Nuclear Arms (with Dr. Dean Curry), Issues of Christian Conscience Series, Word Publishing Group (January 1987), ISBN 0849905761
- The Peacemaker, Abingdon Press (May 1987), ISBN 0687303532
- I'll See You Again, Herald Press (April 4, 1989), ISBN 0836134893
- Mastering Outreach & Evangelism (with Ratz and Tillapaugh), CT, Multnomah, Mastering Ministry Series, Thomas Nelson (June 1, 1990), ISBN 0880703636
- The Deacon (with his daughter, Marcia, a historical novel), Herald Press (July 1, 1990), ISBN 0919797946
- The Christ Shaped Conscience, Scripture Press Publications; 1st printing edition (September 1990), ISBN 0896931927
- How To Be a Christ Shaped Family (with Esther), republished as God Sculptures the Family, Victor Books; first printing edition (February 1994), ISBN 1564760731
- The Robe of God, Herald Press (December 2000), ISBN 0836191366
- The Preacher’s Commentary Matthew, Thomas Nelson (March 1, 2002), ISBN 0785247998
- Pilgrim Aflame (a historical novel, now in film, The Radicals) Herald Press (June 1, 2005), ISBN 0836118405
- The Resurrection Life, Evangel Pub House (August 30, 2005), ISBN 192891571X
- Soli Deo Gloria, a daily devotional through Romans, Herald Press (March 27, 2007), ISBN 0836192893
- The Fugitive, the story of Menno Simons, Herald Press (June 13, 2008), ASIN: B003C1QSSC
- The Kingdom is For Real: Meditations on Discipleship of the Risen Lord, WestBowPress (June 22, 2012), ISBN 1449750451
