= John H. Oberholtzer =

American Mennonite leader (1809–1895)

John H. Oberholtzer (10 January 1809 – 15 February 1895) was a North American Mennonite leader who advocated for Mennonite cooperation for the purpose of higher education and mission work. He provided key leadership during the formation of the General Conference Mennonite Church.

Oberholtzer was born on a farm in Berks County, Pennsylvania, the second child of Abraham and Susanna Oberholtzer. Starting at age sixteen he was employed as a schoolteacher and learned locksmithing to supplement his income. Between school teaching and his locksmith shop in Bucks County, Pennsylvania, Oberholtzer was in daily contact with a wider variety of people and ideas than other Mennonites in the area, who tended to be more withdrawn.

At the age of 33, Oberholtzer became the pastor of his congregation, Swamp Mennonite Church. Mennonite pastors were untrained, unpaid and selected by lot. The selection process began with nominations from the congregation. A set of Bibles, one for each nominee, was presented to the candidates. The one selecting the Bible containing a hidden slip of paper was ordained as the new pastor. Oberholtzer was expected to remain a minister in the Swamp congregation for the remainder of his life.

== Franconia Conference ==
Oberholtzer's congregation was part of Franconia Conference, a group of 22 Mennonite congregations located in eastern Pennsylvania. Conference leadership was composed of five bishops plus ministers and deacons from the congregations. Not long after he became a pastor, Oberholtzer was also selected to be bishop for the congregations of the Swamp area.

Because of Oberholtzer's interest and contact with the wider world, his ideas clashed with the more conservative members at Franconia conference sessions. Areas of disagreement arose around the need for ministers to wear a particular style of colonial coat, whether more formal meeting procedures should be adopted and how open the church should be to Christians from other denominations.

Oberholtzer suggested that the Franconia Conference adopt a formal constitution, document procedures and keep minutes of their meetings. These practices had never been done in the past and the majority thought that they were not necessary. When Oberholtzer and his supporters were not allowed to bring these items up for discussion, a rift developed between the two groups.

== East Pennsylvania Conference ==
Attempts to reconcile the division failed and in 1847 a new group, East Pennsylvania Conference, was formed from about a quarter of the original Franconia members. Oberholtzer provided leadership for the new conference, creating a set of guidelines to act as a constitution. He initiated contact with Canadian and European Mennonites in order to incorporate ideas from the broader Mennonite world into the new conference.

Oberholtzer stressed training for young people wanting to become church members. He distributed a catechism booklet among the churches as a guide for religious education. The class he formed for his own congregation in 1857 was one of the first Mennonite Sunday schools in North America.

Oberholtzer purchased a hand printing press in 1851 and set it up in his locksmith shop. He published Der Religiöse Botschafter (the Religious Messenger) with a circulation of 400, the first successful Mennonite periodical in North America. The financial burden and the demands on his time ended the operation after three years. In 1856, with funding from 92 shareholders, the Mennonite Printing Union was organized and printing resumed with a periodical named Das Christliche Volksblatt. Besides the periodical, books and other material were printed at this new facility. Oberholtzer's contribution as publisher and editor was to have significant influence on Mennonites in North America.

Oberholtzer writing reflected his response to issues of his time. He advocated open communion, allowing Christians of other denomination participate. With respect to the emotional prayer meeting movement, he believed one should pray continuously and need not participate in specially arranged prayer meetings. He was opposed to church members participating in secret societies and believed foot washing should be taken symbolically, not literally. Oberholtzer believed participation in war is always wrong.

== General Conference ==
In an effort to communicate with like-minded Mennonites, Oberholtzer's publications were circulated beyond the borders of the East Pennsylvania Conference. Oberholtzer pursued contacts with Mennonites in Ontaria, Ohio and Iowa, promoting his ideas about inter-Mennonite cooperation.

In 1859, a newly organized group of Mennonites in Iowa invited any interest Mennonites to join them in forming a union to work together to promote missions. The invitation was published in Das Christliche Volksblatt with Oberholtzer endorsing the idea. A formal meeting took place on 29 May 1860, resulting in the creation of the General Conference Mennonite Church. Oberholtzer was a key committee member in drawing up the organization's constitution and presided over four of the initial sessions. When Daniel Hege visited Pennsylvania the following year to explain the purpose of the new conference, Oberholtzer's own East Pennsylvania Conference joined and would become the Eastern District Conference within this new structure.

One of the new conference's initial goals was to provide higher education in order to train missionaries. This goal was realized with the creation of Wadsworth Institute. Oberholtzer was a key supporter of this project, helping to write its constitution. Oberholtzer continued to be an active leader in the General Conference Mennonite Church throughout his life.

== Family and last years ==
Oberholtzer married Mary Reihn. They had one son and one daughter. Mary Reihn died in 1871 and both children preceded Oberholtzer in death. Oberholtzer married Susanna Moyer in 1872. He died at the age of 86 and was buried at Swamp Mennonite Church where he had served as a pastor.
