= General Conference Mennonite Church =

Mennonite church association (1860–2002)

- Classification: Protestant
- Orientation: Anabaptist
- Polity: Congregational
- Region: United States, Canada
- Origin: May 29, 1860; Iowa
- Merged into: Mennonite Church Canada (2000); Mennonite Church USA (2002)

The General Conference Mennonite Church (GCMC) was a mainline association of Mennonite congregations based in North America from 1860 to 2002. The conference was formed in 1860 when congregations in Iowa invited North American Mennonites to join in order to pursue common goals such as higher education and mission work. The conference was especially attractive to recent Mennonite and Amish immigrants to North America and expanded considerably when thousands of Russian Mennonites arrived in North America starting in the 1870s. Conference offices were located in Winnipeg, Manitoba and North Newton, Kansas. The conference supported a seminary and several colleges. In the 1990s the conference had 64,431 members in 410 congregations in Canada, the United States and South America. After decades of cooperation with the Mennonite Church, the two groups reorganized into Mennonite Church Canada in 2000 and Mennonite Church USA in 2002.

== Background ==
Mennonites first came to North America as early as 1644. The first permanent settlement was in the Germantown, Pennsylvania area when a group of 34 Mennonites and Quakers from Krefeld, Germany arrived in 1683. A total of 4000 Mennonites and 200 Amish, a closely related group, settled in eastern Pennsylvania by the 1820s. This group tended to separate from their neighbors because of refusal to participate in the American Revolution, opposition to public education and rejection of religious revivalism.

In the first half of the 19th century new waves of emigration and migration brought thousands of Mennonites to Pennsylvania, Ontario, Ohio, Indiana and Illinois. By the 1860s Mennonites were found in Missouri and Iowa. The recent arrivals from Europe tended to be more educated than the eastern Pennsylvania group and had adopted new ideas and practices.

These various groups of Mennonites were loosely organized. The settlements west of Pennsylvania were scattered and had difficulty communicating with each other. A concern arose independently among these congregations for a way to connect and organize families that were scattered from Ontario to the American frontier.

=== Franconia Conference ===
By 1769 a group of 22 Mennonite congregations in eastern Pennsylvania had organized Franconia Conference. Member congregations sent representatives to regular meetings where policy and membership issues were discussed and decided. Decisions were based on Biblical interpretation. The group felt no need for a written constitution and no meeting minutes were recorded.

In 1842 John H. Oberholtzer became a minister within the Franconia Conference and shortly thereafter a bishop. In this role he attended the conference sessions. As a schoolteacher and locksmith, he had greater contact with the outside world than other ministers. Early on he resisted the expectation of ministers to wear a particular style of colonial coat, preferring more contemporary attire. Observing the process the more conservative members of the conference used to apply pressure to bring him in line with their expectations, it was evident to him that a clear set of rules and a fair process would be better for the conference than relying on arbitrary interpretation of scripture passages.

At a subsequent conference session Oberholtzer proposed a set of guidelines, a minimal constitution, for the organization and suggested that minutes of meetings be recorded so that decisions would be documented. When a majority of the more influential members of the conference refused to let him even present his proposal, or distribute a printed copy, a rift developed among the conference delegates.

=== East Pennsylvania Conference ===
After attempts to reconcile the two groups failed, Oberholtzer and about a quarter of the members formed a new group, the East Pennsylvania Conference. Oberholtzer purchased a hand printing press in 1851 and set it up in his locksmith shop. He began publishing Der Religiöse Botschafter (the Religious Messenger) with a circulation of 400, the first successful Mennonite periodical in North America. The financial burden and the demands on his time ended the operation after three years. In 1856, with funding from 92 shareholders, the Mennonite Printing Union was organized and printing resumed with a periodical named Das Christliche Volksblatt. Besides the periodical, books and other material were printed at this new facility. Oberholtzer's contribution as publisher and editor was to have significant influence on Mennonites in North America.

Through wide circulation of his paper, visits to Mennonites in Ontario and Ohio and correspondence with Mennonites in Europe, Oberholtzer begin developing a network of contacts with shared interests. These Mennonites were more open to interaction with other Christians and were interested in education and mission work. Volksblatt published reports from among the scattered North American Mennonites and from the more educated Mennonites in Europe.

Oberholtzer was particularly interested in organizing Mennonites in Ohio, Ontario and Pennsylvania for the purpose of ministering to Mennonite families scattered throughout the region. He proposed a union based on a basic set of ideals: the doctrine of salvation in Christ, the sacraments, good works and freedom in externals. Although formal organization did not materialize, this type of cooperation was an ongoing theme in Volksblatt.

== Organizing and gathering ==
In the 1850s the Mennonite congregations of Franklin Center and West Point in Lee County, Iowa adopted a common constitution in order to cooperate in various projects, stressing the desire to preserve the religious faith of the small frontier groups of Mennonites. At their 1859 conference meeting a resolution was adopted to invite North American Mennonites to join this union in order to promote home and foreign missions. This invitation was extended to all Mennonites and published in Volksblatt.

At a meeting the following year, four individual from outside the local congregations attended the gathering, including one from Ontario and Oberholtzer from Pennsylvania. An association of Mennonite congregations was proposed that would accept any congregation, regardless of other connections, that held a basic set of Mennonite beliefs: baptism, non-swearing of oaths and the authority of Scripture. Complete freedom was to be permitted in all matters not explicitly taught in the Scriptures. Although Mennonite beliefs such as rejection of violence were not specifically mentioned, these were assumed to be covered by the authority of Scripture.

In essentials unity, in nonessentials liberty, in all things love.

— Translation of a 17th-century ecclesiastical maxim

Agreement in essentials and freedom in nonessentials was the formula for uniting congregations that varied widely in custom and practice. This formal organizational meeting on 29 May 1860 is considered the beginning of the General Conference Mennonite Church. The minutes of the meeting refer to the group as Conference Minutes of the General Mennonite Community of North America (translated from German).

The group resolved to organize a mission society, establish a training school for Christian workers, form a historical society and print tracts. Daniel Hege was appointed to travel among Mennonite communities in the United States and Canada to promote cooperation for mission work and education.

=== Higher education ===
Through the contacts made by Hege in the year after the 1860 meeting, other Mennonite communities became interested in the new conference. The East Pennsylvania group joined the conference in 1861, shortly after Hege's visit. Hege also raised nearly $6000 for the proposed school. Within ten years the General Conference had 1500 members from 20 congregations.

Plans to create a school for training pastors and missionaries proceeded rapidly. A site was chosen in Wadsworth, Ohio and the school was constructed and dedicated in 1866. Wadsworth Institute was opened on 2 January 1868 with twenty-four students enrolled in a three-year program of study. Wadsworth was the first Mennonite institution of higher learning in North America and trained a generation of church leaders. The school operated for eleven years before it fell into financial difficulty. The conference had several other competing concerns, including supporting mission work and resettling thousands of Mennonite immigrants from Russia who started arriving in the 1870s.

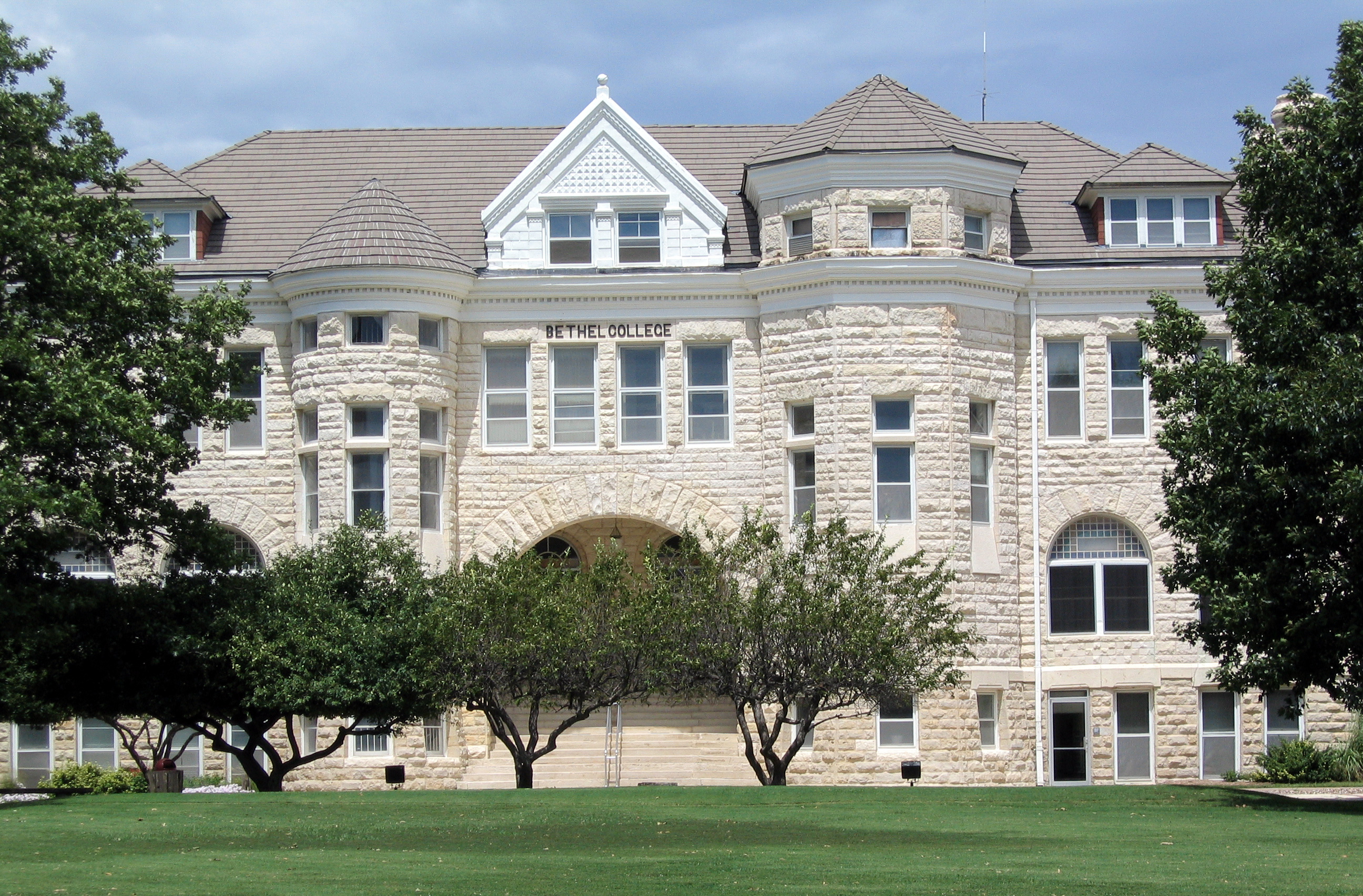
Bethel College Administration Building, in North Newton, Kansas

The arriving Mennonites had a century of experience running schools in Russia. Emmental, a training school for teachers was opened on 13 September 1882 north of Newton, Kansas in a school building associated with Alexanderwohl Mennonite Church. The school was moved to Halstead, Kansas where a new building was dedicated on 16 September 1883 as Halstead Seminary. The transformation of the Halstead school to a college began in 1887 when Bethel College Corporation was granted a charter. The school was closed for the 1892–1893 school year while preparations were made to relocate it to North Newton, Kansas where it opened as Bethel College in 1893. Other schools followed: Mennonite Collegiate Institute (Gretna, Manitoba, 1899), Mennonite Central College (Bluffton, Ohio, 1898; now Bluffton University), Freeman Junior College (Freeman, South Dakota, 1903–1986), English-German Academy (Rosthern, Saskatchewan, 1905) which became Rosthern Junior College (1946), Bethel Bible Institute (Abbotsford, British Columbia, 1939), which joined with Mennonite Brethren Bible Institute to become Columbia Bible Institute (now Columbia Bible College) in 1970, and Canadian Mennonite Bible College (Winnipeg, Manitoba, 1947) which combined with Concord College and Menno Simons College in 2000 to become Canadian Mennonite University.

In 1914 Mennonite Central College was reorganized into Bluffton College and Mennonite Seminary. The seminary was renamed Witmarsum Theological Seminary in 1921 and provided training for church workers until it was closed in 1931. In 1945 Mennonite Biblical Seminary was started in Chicago, Illinois. The seminary was affiliated with Bethany Biblical Seminary, a Church of the Brethren institution. In 1958 Associated Mennonite Biblical Seminary was formed when the seminary joined with Goshen College Biblical Seminary, a Mennonite Church school in Goshen, Indiana. An Elkhart, Indiana site was chosen as a neutral location between the two previous schools. Originally planned as two separate institutions sharing common facilities, the seminary functioned in practice as a single school after the first decade.

=== Mission work ===
A mission board was formed shortly after the 1860 creation of the conference. Its initial work consisted primarily of promoting missions and collecting funds. The mission board explored sending mission workers to Java under an existing program of European Mennonites. When it became clear that the Europeans were not interested in working jointly with the new conference, the board decided to focus on working independently of existing mission organizations.

The first mission worker, Samuel S. Haury, was sent to Darlington and Cantonment in Indian Territory (later Oklahoma) in 1880 to work among the Arapaho. He was followed in 1884 by Henry R. Voth. Voth moved to Arizona in 1893 to start work with the Hopi. Rudolphe Petter spent fifteen years in Indian Territory and then worked with the Cheyenne in Montana for the rest of his life.

The first mission workers sent overseas were Elizabeth and Peter A. Penner of Mountain Lake, Minnesota along with J. F. and Susanna Kroeker, arriving in Bombay 9 December 1900, to start work in India. Schoolteacher Annie C. Funk arrived in India in 1906, becoming the first single woman Mennonite mission worker. Funk returned home on her first furlough in 1912 on RMS Titanic, losing her life when she gave up her seat on the last lifeboat to a mother with children. Henry J. Brown, another worker from Mountain Lake, was the first conference missionary in China. Arriving in December 1909 without formal support, his work was approved by the conference in 1914. Later areas of work included Taiwan, Japan, Zaire, Colombia, Paraguay, Uruguay, Brazil, Bolivia, and Costa Rica.

Another aspect of outreach was home missions, which began among scattered Mennonite communities in North America that were without pastoral leadership. This work was expanded to working with Mennonites in Mexico and South America. City missions were developed in Los Angeles, Chicago, Altoona, Pennsylvania and Hutchinson, Kansas. Patterned after the work of other denominations, preaching, home visitation, Sunday Schools and work with children were emphasized.

== District conferences ==
The congregations of the General Conference Mennonite Church were organized into provincial conferences in Canada and five area conferences in the United States. Nearly all congregations were associated with an area conference while a few were members of the General Conference directly. In the 1990s the conference had 64,431 members in 410 congregations in Canada, the United States and South America.

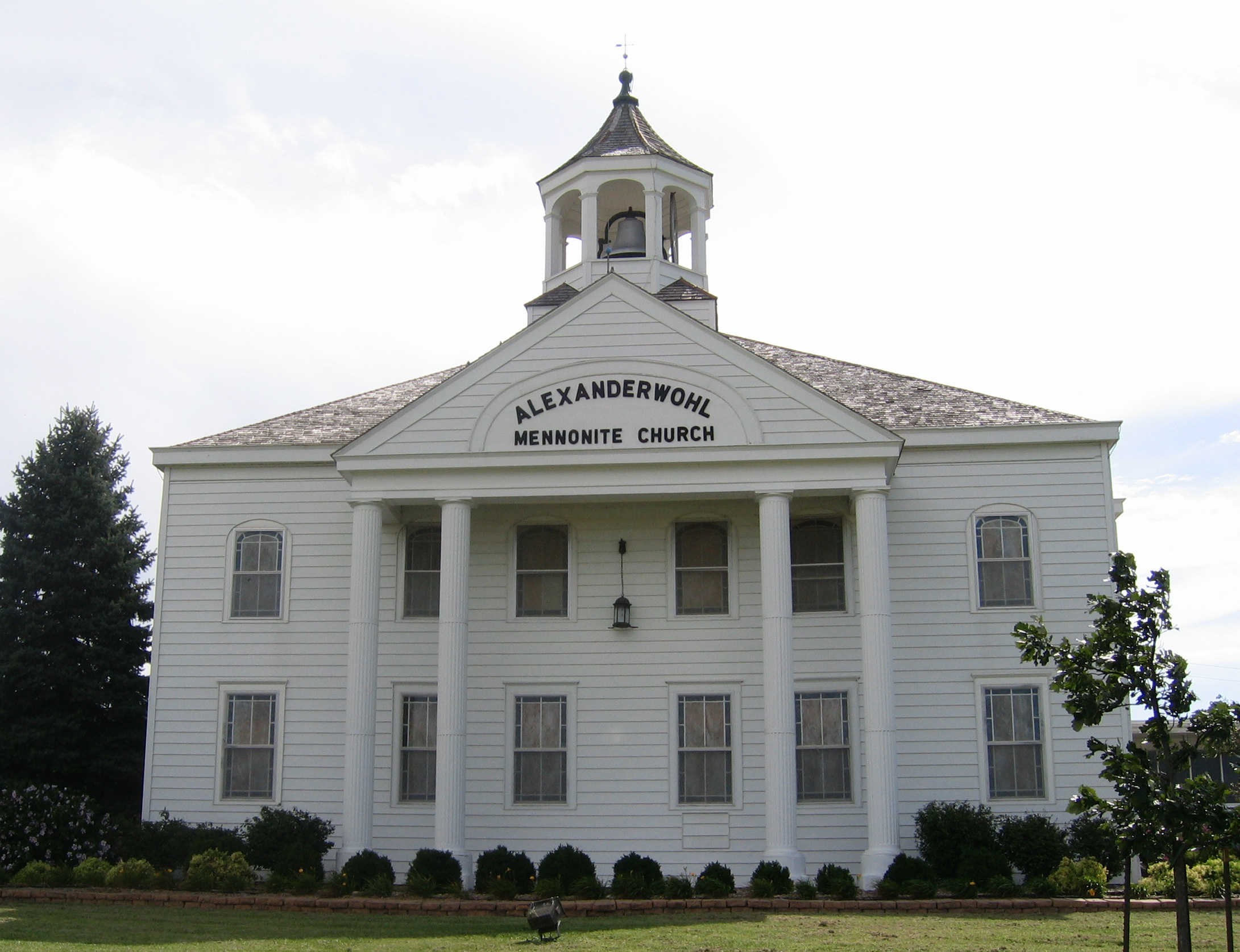
Alexanderwohl Mennonite Church, in Goessel, Kansas

The Eastern District Conference initially consisted of churches from the East Pennsylvania Conference that joined the General Conference in 1861. In 1999 it had 28 congregations in Pennsylvania, New York and Massachusetts. The Western District Conference was organized in 1888 by combining the western part of an earlier organized Western Conference and an earlier organized Kansas conference. In 1999 it had 80 congregations in Kansas, Nebraska, Texas, Oklahoma and Colorado. The Northern District Conference was organized in 1894. In 1999 it had 33 congregations in Minnesota, Montana, North Dakota, South Dakota and Nebraska.

The Pacific District Conference was organized in 1896. By 1999 the southern part had joined with the Southwest Mennonite Conference of the Mennonite Church to become the Pacific Southwest Mennonite Conference, which consisted of 56 congregations in Mexico, Arizona, California and Florida. The northern part joined with Pacific Coast Conference of the Mennonite Church to become the Pacific Northwest Mennonite Conference, which had 32 congregations in Oregon, Washington and Idaho.

The Central District Conference was formed in 1956 by combining Central Illinois Mennonite Conference and former Middle District. The Central Illinois Conference was made up of twenty congregations of Amish descent that joined the General Conference in 1946. In 1999 the Central District had 67 congregations in Iowa, Illinois, Ohio, Missouri, Indiana, Kentucky, Wisconsin and Michigan.

The Conference of Mennonites in Canada was an organization of Canadian churches that related to the General Conference Mennonite Church. The Canadian conference was itself divided into separate conferences for British Columbia, Alberta, Saskatchewan, Manitoba and Ontario. About a quarter of the congregations within these area conferences chose not to affiliate with the General Conference, a pattern in contrast to the United States conferences where almost all area conference congregations were also General Conference members.

The Canadian conference began as the Conference of Mennonites in Middle Canada and was created 1903 to help Bergthaler Mennonites who were moving west from Manitoba, many to the Rosthern, Saskatchewan area. Bergthalers were originally from five entire villages of Russian Mennonites who had all migrated together. They were a more conservative group who preferred to run their own affairs, including schools.

One of earliest activities was to provide and coordinate training for teachers. Mennonite Collegiate Institute (Gretna, Manitoba, 1899) was soon followed by Mennonite Educational Institute (Altona, Manitoba) and the German-English Academy, now Rosthern Junior College (Rosthern, Saskatchewan, 1905). Strong support for schools continued through the history of the conference, which by the 1990s included these additional schools: Canadian Mennonite Bible College (Winnipeg, Manitoba), Columbia Bible College (Abbotsford, British Columbia), Conrad Grebel University College (Waterloo, Ontario), Swift Current Bible Institute (Swift Current, Saskatchewan), United Mennonite Education Institute (Leamington, Ontario) and Westgate Mennonite Collegiate (Winnipeg, Manitoba).

From 1923 to 1930 an additional 21,000 Mennonites arrived in Canada from Russia. The Canadian Board of Mennonite Colonization borrowed 1.9 million dollars to aid in the resettlement of these new immigrants. Many of these arrivals were settled on farms in Alberta and Saskatchewan. This group of Mennonites tended to be more urbanized and better educated than the Canadian Mennonites, and were drawn to Canada's cities. Winnipeg, Manitoba became the city with the largest population of Mennonites. After World War II 8000 more Russian Mennonites came to Canada.

Conference of Mennonite in Canada 1999 Membership
Congregations	Members	Conference
18	2,165	Conference of Mennonites in Alberta
35	4,371	Conference of Mennonites in British Columbia
51	10,557	Conference of Mennonites in Manitoba
40	4,646	Conference of Mennonites of Saskatchewan
94	13,507	Mennonite Conference of Eastern Canada

== Expansion and programs ==
The initial conference goals of education and mission work were well under way by the 1920s. World War II brought new challenges. Conscientious objectors from Canadian congregations were serving in Alternative Service projects, primarily in western Canada and then later closer to home on farms and in industry. In the United States, 828 men (almost 50 percent of those drafted) from General Conference churches served in Civilian Public Service (CPS). The conference raised $500,000 over six years to pay for its share of the program as it cooperated with other peace churches in the administration of CPS. The CPS experience created a generation of church leaders and continued an ongoing process of inter-Mennonite cooperation.

In addition to the creation of a new seminary, the post-war years saw the expansion of existing work and new projects. Work on the Mennonite Encyclopedia was started in 1946 in cooperation with the Mennonite Church. The goal was to complete the German Mennonitisches Lexikon and then translate and rewrite it into a suitable English version. The first volume was completed in 1955 and the fourth volume of the 3827 page work in 1959. A fifth supplementary volume was produced in 1990 with new and updated information.

Mission Statement
God calls us to be followers of Jesus Christ and by the power of the Holy Spirit to grow as communities of grace, joy and peace, so that God's healing and hope flow through us to the world.
Adopted 1995.

Throughout its history, the General Conference Mennonite Church organizational structure was divided among various committees and boards. Around 1970 the boards were reorganized into commissions, including Commission on Education to oversee various educational activities and interests, Commission on Home Ministries which worked with mission activities in North America such as church planting and helping other Mennonite groups in Central and South America, Commission on Overseas Mission which dealt with overseas mission activities, Higher Education Council which worked with Mennonite colleges, Faith & Life Press which was the publishing and printing agency of the conference, Ministerial Leadership Services which worked with ministerial leadership and congregations and Division of General Services which oversaw the financial and business aspects of running the conference. Conference offices were maintained in Winnipeg, Manitoba and North Newton, Kansas. The conference printed two periodicals: the Mennonite and Der Bote, which reached ninety percent of members' homes

== Political involvement ==
Mennonites in North America originally avoided political involvement if possible. This began to gradually change among General Conference Mennonites. Immigrants from Russia were slow to become citizens citing reservations over implied responsibilities, specifically military service. Those that began the naturalization process did so to participate at local polls and in national elections. In the United States, the Mennonite vote was split among the major political parties until 1940 when it predominantly favored the Republican Party. Philanthropist Jacob A. Schowalter (1879–1953) was an early Democratic Party officeholder but it would be two decades before academics and church leaders began emphasizing social justice and peace-related ideals that more closely aligned with the Democratic Party, with a corresponding shift in voting patterns.

One of the first Mennonites to become politically involved was Peter Jansen (1852–1923) a sheep rancher from rural Beatrice, Nebraska. Upon arriving from Russia in 1873, he met with President Grant who was interested in the proposed immigration of Mennonites from Russia. Jansen was impressed by the contrast between the pomp and glitter of Russian officialdom and the practicality he found in Washington. From that point, Jansen took an interest in politics and supported causes he felt would better his adopted country. He participated in county and state Republican conventions. Jansen was elected alternate delegate to the 1884 Republican National Convention and was a delegate-at-large to the 1896 convention that nominated William McKinley.

Jansen did not seek political office for himself, but in 1880 his neighbors elected him justice of the peace. Later he served as Nebraska state representative and then state senator. He turned down nomination for Governor of Nebraska because of the position's requirement to enforce the death penalty. In 1900 President McKinley appointed Jansen as one of twelve commissioners to the Paris World's Fair. In 1901 he represented Nebraska at the state funeral of McKinley.

One reason for early alignment with the Republican Party was self-interest in keeping commodity prices high. The Daniel Unruh (1820–1893) family produced grain and wool in Turner County, South Dakota. As a result of the Wilson-Gorman Tariff of 1894 the price of wool was so low that it just covered the cost of shipment to Chicago. As with other Mennonite farmers, Unruh's sons became strong supporters of high tariffs favored by the Republican Party.

By 1900 General Conference Mennonites were regularly voting in national elections. Pastor Andrew B. Shelly (1834–1913) openly and proudly wore the Republican lapel. His son was the district attorney and chairman of the Bucks County, Pennsylvania Republican Committee. Shelly was rumored to have told his congregation to vote for Theodore Roosevelt in the 1908 presidential election. Shelly denied this in a front-page article in the Quakertown (Pennsylvania) Free Press.

The influence of evangelist turned politician Gerald B. Winrod among Kansas Mennonites in the 1930s is indicative of a shift toward right-wing patriotism that gained popularity among Mennonites at that time. The influence of Christian fundamentalism and corresponding wariness of modernism combined with Mennonite self-reliance produced an anti-Roosevelt reaction by 1940 that put General Conference Mennonites solidly behind Republican candidates for several decades.

== Cooperation and reorganization ==
Starting in the 1940s the General Conference Mennonite Church and the Mennonite Church worked on several cooperative projects. Among these were Civilian Public Service and Mennonite Central Committee, which oversaw the Mennonite part of the CPS. In the 1950s the two groups created Associated Mennonite Biblical Seminary together. Joint hymnal projects were completed in 1969 (The Mennonite Hymnal) and 1992 (Hymnal a Worshipbook). A joint Confession of Faith in a Mennonite Perspective was completed in 1995.

Another force in the movement towards uniting the two groups was simultaneously happening at the grassroots level. As Mennonites moved from rural areas, they formed new urban congregations, bringing together people from both denominations. These congregations would then seek affiliation in area conferences of both denominations. By the 1990s there were dozens of these dual-affiliated congregations. As cooperation between the two groups increased, overlapping area conferences began looking at ways to work together and plan for an inevitable merger.

The increasing cooperation occurred in parallel with discussions about joining the two groups. Starting in 1983, the two groups met together in joint delegate sessions from time to time. By 1989 an intentional effort was underway to devise a plan for merging the two organizations, which culminated in a 1999 delegate session where a new joint structure was approved. The transformation was completed soon thereafter in Canada and by 2002 in the United States. The two groups, General Conference Mennonite Church (GCMC) and Mennonite Church (MC), became two new national groups: Mennonite Church Canada and Mennonite Church USA.

GCMC Area Conference	Joined With MC Area Conference	To Form
United Mennonite Churches in Ontario	Mennonite Conference of Ontario and Quebec; Western Ontario Mennonite Conference	Mennonite Conference of Eastern Canada
Northern District	Iowa-Nebraska	Central Plains Mennonite Conference; Some Montana congregations join North Central Conference.
(Northern) Pacific District	Pacific Coast	Pacific Northwest Mennonite Conference
(Southern) Pacific District	Southwest	Pacific Southwest Mennonite Conference
Central District	Remains Central District Conference, overlapping Illinois, Indiana-Michigan and Ohio Conferences; Some western Illinois congregations join Central Plains.	
Eastern District	Remains Eastern District Conference with some congregations switching affiliation to nearby conferences.	
Western District	Remains Western District Conference; Two Colorado congregations join Mountain States Conference, formed in 2005.	

== Camp Men-O-Lan ==
Camp Men-O-Lan is the oldest continuously operating Mennonite camp in North America, and located in Quakertown, Pennsylvania. Camp Men-O-Lan is a member of the Mennonite Camping Association and the Christian Camp and Conference Association. Camp Men-O-Lan was established in 1941 by the Eastern District Conference of the General Conference Mennonite Church. The camp name is a combination of Mennonite and Landis, the name of the denomination and the last name of the donor of the original property for the camp, J. Walter Landis. The camp is located on 174 acres in Upper Bucks County, PA. Open year-round, camp facilities include 11 cabins housing up to 16 campers each, a dormitory, swimming pool, lake, paddle boats and canoes, challenge course, water slide, gymnasium, and an environmentally planned trail system.
