= AMBS =

AMBS may refer to:

- Anabaptist Mennonite Biblical Seminary, an Anabaptist Christian seminary based in the US
- Advanced Media Broadcasting System, a Philippine broadcast media company
