= David Augsburger =

American Anabaptist (1938–2023)

David W. Augsburger
- Born: August 14, 1938; Delphos, Ohio, U.S.
- Died: October 30, 2023 (aged 85); Claremont, California, U.S.
- Education: Eastern Mennonite College (B.A., 1960); Eastern Mennonite Seminary (B.Div., 1963); Claremont School of Theology (Ph.D. in Personality, Theology & Psychotherapy, 1974)
- Occupation: Pastoral counselor · Author · Educator
- Years active: 1961–2023
- Known for: Leading figure in pastoral care and cross-cultural conflict mediation
- Notable work: Caring Enough to Confront (1980); The Freedom of Forgiveness (1988); Conflict Mediation Across Cultures (1992); Dissident Discipleship (2006)
- Spouse: Leann Elrich Augsburger
- Children: Three

David W. Augsburger (August 14, 1938 – October 30, 2023) was an American Mennonite pastor, author, theologian, counselor, and educator, known for his influential work in pastoral care, cross-cultural counseling, and conflict mediation.

== Early life and education ==
Born in Delphos, Ohio, and raised on a farm in Elida, he was the youngest of six children. His parents were Clarence and Estella Augsburger. He earned degrees from Eastern Mennonite College (B.A., 1960) and Eastern Mennonite Seminary (B.Div., 1963), and completed a Ph.D. in Personality, Theology, and Psychotherapy at Claremont School of Theology in 1974.

== Career ==
Augsburger began his career with Mennonite Broadcasts (1961–1974), where he hosted the Mennonite Hour radio program and sang with the Mennonite Hour Quartet. He was ordained in 1963 and served as pastor of Trissels Mennonite Church in Virginia until 1971. He later held faculty positions at Northern Baptist Theological Seminary, Associated Mennonite Biblical Seminary (now AMBS), and Fuller Theological Seminary, where he taught pastoral counseling from 1990 until his retirement in 2012.

Throughout his career, Augsburger led workshops worldwide on reconciliation, forgiveness, cross-cultural conflict, and interpersonal relationships. His major publications include Caring Enough to Confront (1980), Conflict Mediation Across Cultures (1992), The Freedom of Forgiveness (1988), Dissident Discipleship (2006), and Pastoral Counseling Across Cultures (1986). His Caring Enough series remains widely used in counseling and ministry settings.

A devoted pacifist and peacemaker, Augsburger was known for his compassion, deep listening, and ability to confront injustice with grace. He co-pastored Peace Mennonite Fellowship in Claremont, California for many years until his death. Augsburger was a minister of the Mennonite Church and a diplomate of the American Association of Pastoral Counselors.

== Personal life and death ==
Augsburger was married to Leann Elrich Augsburger, and had three children. His brother Myron was a prominent Mennonite Church author, evangelist, and theologian. Augsburger died at home in Claremont, California on October 30, 2023, at age 85.

== Legacy ==
Throughout his career, Augsburger was widely quoted in the media on a variety of topics related to spirituality and pastoral care. He was often cited for his memorable quote about the importance of listening in a relationship: "Being heard is so close to being loved that for the average person they are almost indistinguishable."

== Selected publications ==
- Augsburger, David W. (1970). Life or Limbo. Herald Press – via Open Library.
- Augsburger, David W. (1970). Be All You Can Be. Creation House – via Open Library.
- Augsburger, David W. (1970). The Freedom of Forgiveness. Moody Press. ISBN 9780802428752 – via Internet Archive.
- Augsburger, David W. (1971). Witness Is Withness: More Showing Than Telling. Herald Press – via Open Library.
- Augsburger, David W. (1971). Cherishable: Love and Marriage. Herald Press. ISBN 9780836116625 – via Open Library.
- Augsburger, David W. (1972). Communicating Good News. Herald Press. ISBN 9780836117127 – via Open Library.
- Augsburger, David W. (1973). A Risk Worth Taking. Herald Press – via Open Library.
- Augsburger, David W. (1973). Man, Am I Uptight!. Moody Press. ISBN 9780802451729 – via Internet Archive.
- Augsburger, David W. (1973). Caring Enough to Confront: How to Understand and Express Your Deepest Feelings Toward Others. Revell. ISBN 9780800729189 – via Internet Archive.
- Augsburger, David W. (1979). Anger and Assertiveness in Pastoral Care. Westminster Press – via Open Library.
- Augsburger, David W. (1980). Caring Enough to Hear and Be Heard: How to Hear and How to Be Heard in Equal Communication. Revell. ISBN 9780830708369 – via Open Library.
- Augsburger, David W. (1981). So What? Everybody’s Doing It. Revell – via Open Library.
- Augsburger, David W. (1981). Caring Enough to Forgive—Caring Enough Not to Forgive. Regal Books – via Internet Archive.
- Augsburger, David W. (1982). From Here to Maturity. Tyndale House – via Internet Archive.
- Augsburger, David W. (1983). When Caring Is Not Enough: Resolving Conflicts Through Fair Fighting. Revell – via Open Library.
- Augsburger, David W. (1984). When Enough Is Enough. Revell – via Open Library.
- Augsburger, David W. (1986). Pastoral Counseling Across Cultures. Westminster John Knox Press. ISBN 9780664256166 – via Internet Archive.
- Augsburger, David W. (1989). Sustaining Love: Healing & Growth in the Passages of Marriage. Westminster John Knox Press – via Open Library.
- Augsburger, David W. (1992). Conflict Mediation Across Cultures: Pathways and Patterns. Westminster John Knox Press. ISBN 9780664256098 – via Internet Archive.
- Augsburger, David W. (1996). Helping People Forgive. Westminster John Knox Press. ISBN 9780664256869 – via Internet Archive.
- Augsburger, David W. (2000). The New Freedom of Forgiveness. Moody Publishers. ISBN 9781575676852 – via Open Library.
- Augsburger, David W. (2004). Hate-Work: Working Through the Pain and Pleasures of Hate. Westminster John Knox Press. ISBN 9780664226824 – via Open Library.
- Augsburger, David W. (2006). Dissident Discipleship: A Spirituality of Self-Surrender, Love of God, and Love of Neighbor. Brazos Press – via Open Library.
