= Peter Jansen (politician) =

American politician

Peter Jansen (1852–1923) was a Beatrice, Nebraska sheep rancher and Nebraska state representative and senator.

== Russia ==
Jansen was born on 21 March 1852 in Berdiansk, a port city on the northern coast of the Sea of Azov in the Russian Empire where his family had a grain exporting business. On a large ranch the family leased north of the city, Jansen learned cattle and sheep ranching skills.

Cornelius Jansen, Peter's father, was a consul, representing in Berdyansk interests of Prussia and Mecklenburg-Schwerin. The Jansen family was part of the Mennonite settlement in south Russia. When the government began withdrawing special privileges granted to colonists such as freedom from conscription, Jansen's father advised concerned Mennonites to emigrate to North America. Because of the elder Jansen's position as a prominent citizen and community leader, Russian officials ordered the family out of the country.

== Immigration ==
The family arrived in Quebec on 21 August 1873 and traveled on to Berlin, Ontario. From there Jansen and his father traveled to the United States, visiting New York and Philadelphia. Quaker contacts brought them to Washington, D.C., where Jansen had a chance meeting with George Armstrong Custer along with a delegation of "stoic aboriginies" and was introduced to President Grant who was interested in encouraging immigration of Mennonites from Russia. The contrast between the pomp and glitter of Russian officialdom and the practicality he found in Washington impressed Jansen.

Together with another group of Mennonites who had just arrived in New York, the Jansens choose to settle on a 20,000 acre (81 km^{2}) tract of land in Nebraska. Jansen purchased 1280 acres (5 km^{2}) eighteen miles west of Beatrice where he begin building a merino sheep flock.

Jansen married Gertrude Penner, a Mennonite from Prussia, on 4 May 1877. Together they had seven children, Helen, John, Anna, Katerine, Gertrude, Cornelius and Margaret.

== Ranching ==
Jansen enlarged the ranch by purchasing nearby property, erecting and improving barns and homes for workers and planting trees for shelter and fruit. Besides sheep, Jansen raised wheat and corn. As more settlers filled the Nebraska prairie, Jansen shifted his sheep operation to feeding up to 30,000 western sheep in feedlots.

In 1886 the Chicago, Rock Island and Pacific Railroad surveyed for a new line running west from Saint Joseph, Missouri near Jansen's property. Through his influence, the railroad town four miles west of the Jansen ranch was named Jansen, Nebraska. The ranch was now 20,000 acres (81 km^{2}) and a show place with a well kept yard featuring an artificial lake.

== Political involvement ==
Jansen took an interest in politics and supported causes he felt would better his adopted country. He participated in county and state Republican conventions. Jansen did not seek political office for himself, but in 1880 his neighbors elected him justice of the peace. Later he served as Nebraska state representative and then state senator. He turned down nomination for Governor of Nebraska because of the position's requirement to enforce the death penalty.

Jansen was elected alternate delegate to the 1884 Republican National Convention and was a delegate-at-large to the 1896 convention that nominated William McKinley. In 1900 President McKinley appointed Jansen as one of twelve commissioners to the Paris World's Fair. In 1901 he represented Nebraska at the state funeral of McKinley.

== Retirement ==
In 1909 Jansen sold his ranch and moved to Beatrice. He donated land and funds for construction of the Mennonite Deaconess Home and Hospital in Beatrice. He continued to be active in the community and General Conference Mennonite Church until his death on 6 June 1923.

== Works ==
- Jansen, Peter (1921), Memoirs of Peter Jansen, self-published, Beatrice, NE.
