= Jansen, Nebraska =

- Village
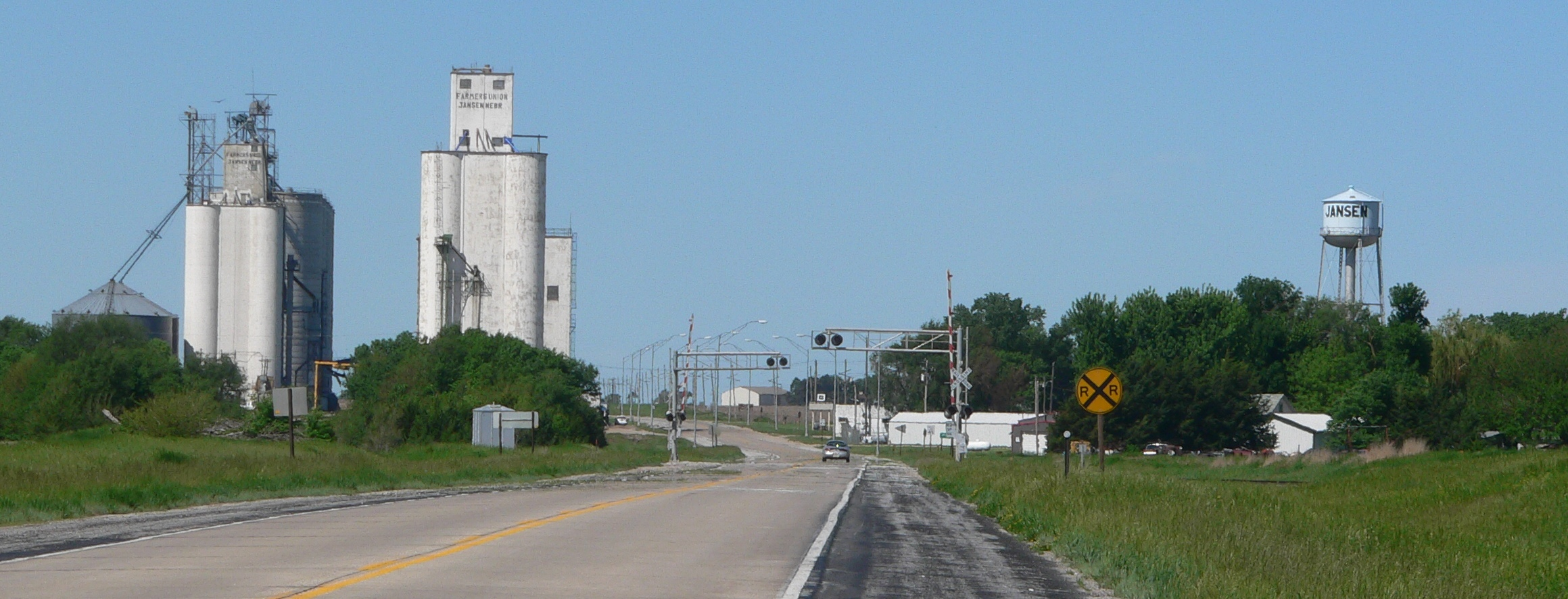
- Jansen, seen from the northeast along U.S. Highway 136

- Location of Jansen, Nebraska
- Coordinates: 40°11′02″N 97°05′05″W
- Country: United States
- State: Nebraska
- County: Jefferson

Area
  - Total: 0.31 sq mi (0.81 km^{2})
  - Land: 0.31 sq mi (0.81 km^{2})
  - Water: 0 sq mi (0.00 km^{2})
- Elevation: 1,460 ft (450 m)

Population (2020)
  - Total: 100
  - Estimate (2021): 99
  - Density: 320/sq mi (120/km^{2})
- Time zone: UTC-6 (Central (CST))
  - Summer (DST): UTC-5 (CDT)
- ZIP code: 68377
- Area code: 402
- FIPS code: 31-24530
- GNIS feature ID: 2398291

Jansen is a village in Jefferson County, Nebraska, United States. The population was 100 at the 2020 census.

== History ==
Jansen was platted in 1886 when the Chicago, Rock Island, and Pacific Railroad was extended to that point. The village was named after local rancher and politician Peter Jansen.

== Geography ==
According to the United States Census Bureau, the village has a total area of 0.23 square miles (0.60 km^{2}), all land.

== Demographics ==
Historical population
Census	Pop.	Note	%±
1900	271		—
1910	308		13.7%
1920	258		−16.2%
1930	264		2.3%
1940	255		−3.4%
1950	244		−4.3%
1960	204		−16.4%
1970	191		−6.4%
1980	204		6.8%
1990	140		−31.4%
2000	144		2.9%
2010	144		0.0%
2020	101		−29.9%
2021 (est.)	99	▼	−2.0%
U.S. Decennial Census

=== 2010 census ===
As of the census of 2010, there were 118 people, 58 households, and 31 families residing in the village. The population density was 513.0 inhabitants per square mile (198.1/km^{2}). There were 67 housing units at an average density of 291.3 per square mile (112.5/km^{2}). The racial makeup of the village was 99.2% White and 0.8% from two or more races.

There were 58 households, of which 19.0% had children under the age of 18 living with them, 48.3% were married couples living together, 5.2% had a female householder with no husband present, and 46.6% were non-families. 39.7% of all households were made up of individuals, and 22.4% had someone living alone who was 65 years of age or older. The average household size was 2.03 and the average family size was 2.74.

The median age in the village was 50 years. 17.8% of residents were under the age of 18; 5% were between the ages of 18 and 24; 19.5% were from 25 to 44; 35.6% were from 45 to 64; and 22% were 65 years of age or older. The gender makeup of the village was 50.8% male and 49.2% female.

=== 2000 census ===
As of the census of 2000, there were 143 people, 65 households, and 38 families residing in the village. The population density was 642.6 inhabitants per square mile (248.1/km^{2}). There were 72 housing units at an average density of 323.5 per square mile (124.9/km^{2}). The racial makeup of the village was 100.00% White. Hispanic or Latino of any race were 0.70% of the population.

There were 65 households, out of which 26.2% had children under the age of 18 living with them, 47.7% were married couples living together, 6.2% had a female householder with no husband present, and 41.5% were non-families. 36.9% of all households were made up of individuals, and 26.2% had someone living alone who was 65 years of age or older. The average household size was 2.20 and the average family size was 2.89.

In the village, the population was spread out, with 25.9% under the age of 18, 6.3% from 18 to 24, 26.6% from 25 to 44, 14.7% from 45 to 64, and 26.6% who were 65 years of age or older. The median age was 39 years. For every 100 females, there were 104.3 males. For every 100 females age 18 and over, there were 92.7 males.

As of 2000 the median income for a household in the village was $28,906, and the median income for a family was $28,906. Males had a median income of $23,750 versus $22,500 for females. The per capita income for the village was $12,091. There were 4.9% of families and 7.5% of the population living below the poverty line, including 2.2% of under eighteens and 18.4% of those over 64.
