= Mennonite Church =

Mennonite Church may refer to:

- Mennonites, an anabaptist denominational family
- Mennonite Church (1683–2002), a denomination which merged with the General Conference Mennonite Church in 2002
- Mennonite Church Canada (2000—)
- Mennonite Church USA (2002—)
