= Der Bote =

German-language Mennonite newspaper (1924–2008)

Der Bote ('The Messenger') was a German-language Mennonite newspaper published in Winnipeg, Manitoba, by Mennonite Church Canada.

Der Bote was first published 16 January 1924 as Der Mennonitische Immigrantenbote by Dietrich H. Epp at Rosthern, Saskatchewan, to serve as a point of contact for German-speaking Russian Mennonites immigrating to Canada after World War I. In 1926 the name was shortened to simply Der Bote. Around this time, the size of the paper was increased to 25 by 19 inches from 9½ by 12½. In 1947, Der Bote merged with Christlicher Bundesbote and became the weekly paper for the General Conference Mennonite Church. By 1950, circulation was 4500, of which 1000 were distributed in Europe and South America as a service to immigrants.

In January 2000 the publication frequency was reduced to 24 times a year and the format reduced to letter size. In 2006, it had approximately 2350 subscribers, down from 9000 in the mid-1970s, with circulation in North America, South America, Russia, Germany and other European countries.

On 30 March 2008 the newspaper closed down and ceased publication due to declining readership.

== See also ==
- List of newspapers in Canada
