= Guns into Plowshares =

Sculpture by Esther and Michael Augsburger

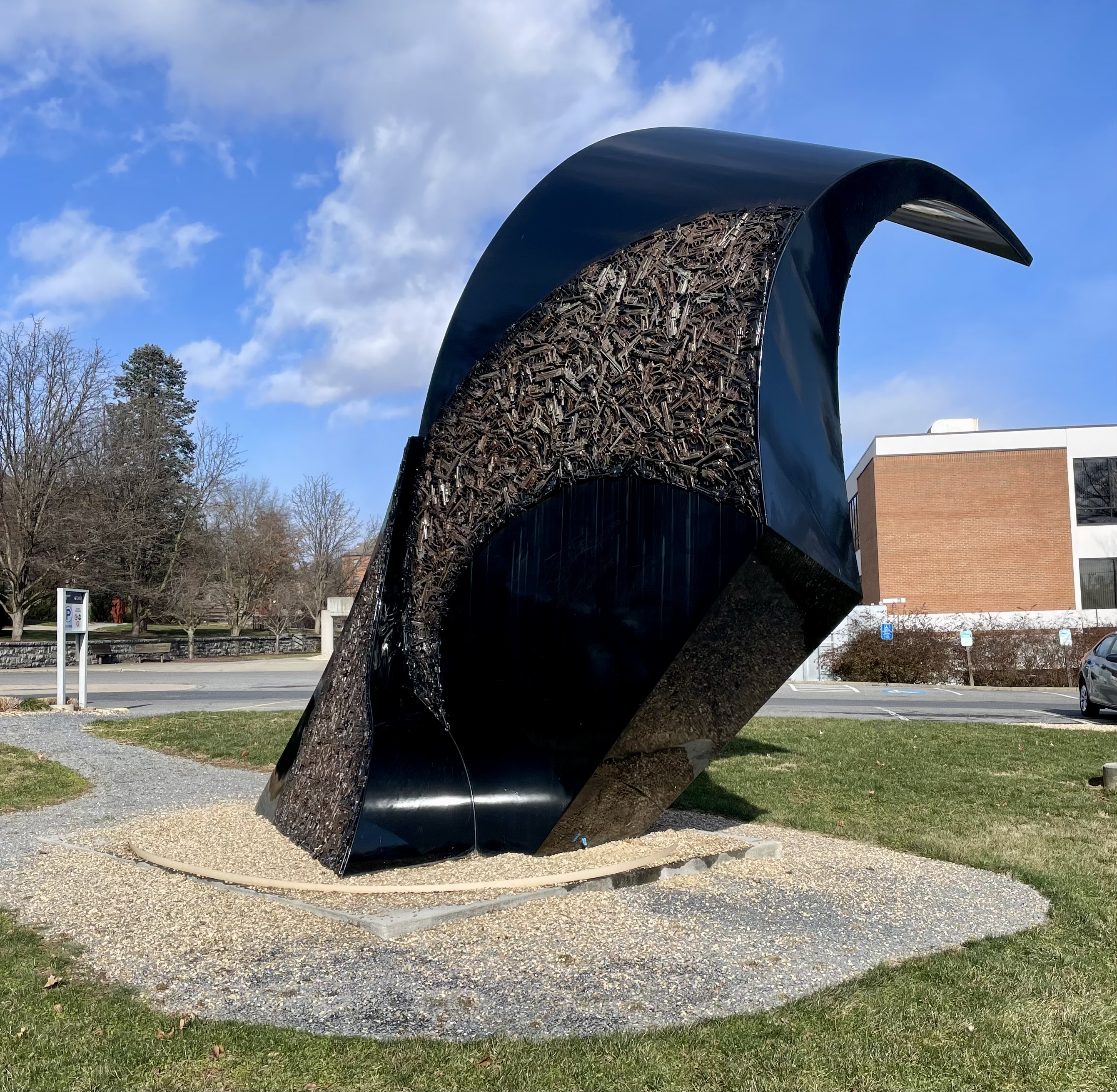
- Artist: Esther Augsburger; Michael Augsburger
- Year: 1997
- Type: Sculpture
- Medium: Steel; Disabled handguns
- Dimensions: 4.9 m (16 ft)
- Weight: 4 tons
- Location: Washington, D.C., United States; 38°51′12″N 76°59′43.9″W

Guns into Plowshares is a sculpture by Mennonite artists Esther Augsburger and Michael Augsburger. It depicts the blade of a giant plow, fashioned out of steel and 3,000 disabled handguns. It stands sixteen feet tall and weighs four tons. The work alludes to a passage from the Book of Isaiah in which the ancient Israelite prophet envisions a future when people "shall beat their swords into plowshares, and their spears into pruning hooks; nation shall not lift up sword against nation, neither shall they learn war any more" (Isaiah 2:4; cf. Micah 4:3). The image of transforming swords into plowshares has been widely adopted by social and political groups working for peace.

The sculpture was conceived in 1994, when the artists heard of a gun buyback program coordinated by the Washington, D.C., police. After three years of work, Guns into Plowshares was completed in 1997.

== History ==
The Augsburgers began work on the sculpture in 1994. Esther was living in Washington, D.C., with her husband Myron Augsburger, a prominent Mennonite pastor, and teaching after-school art classes. She heard her students talking often about family members lost to gun violence, and one of her own students was shot and killed. She and Michael Augsburger, her son, learned of a gun buyback program coordinated by the D.C. police and funded by heavyweight boxing champion Riddick Bowe.

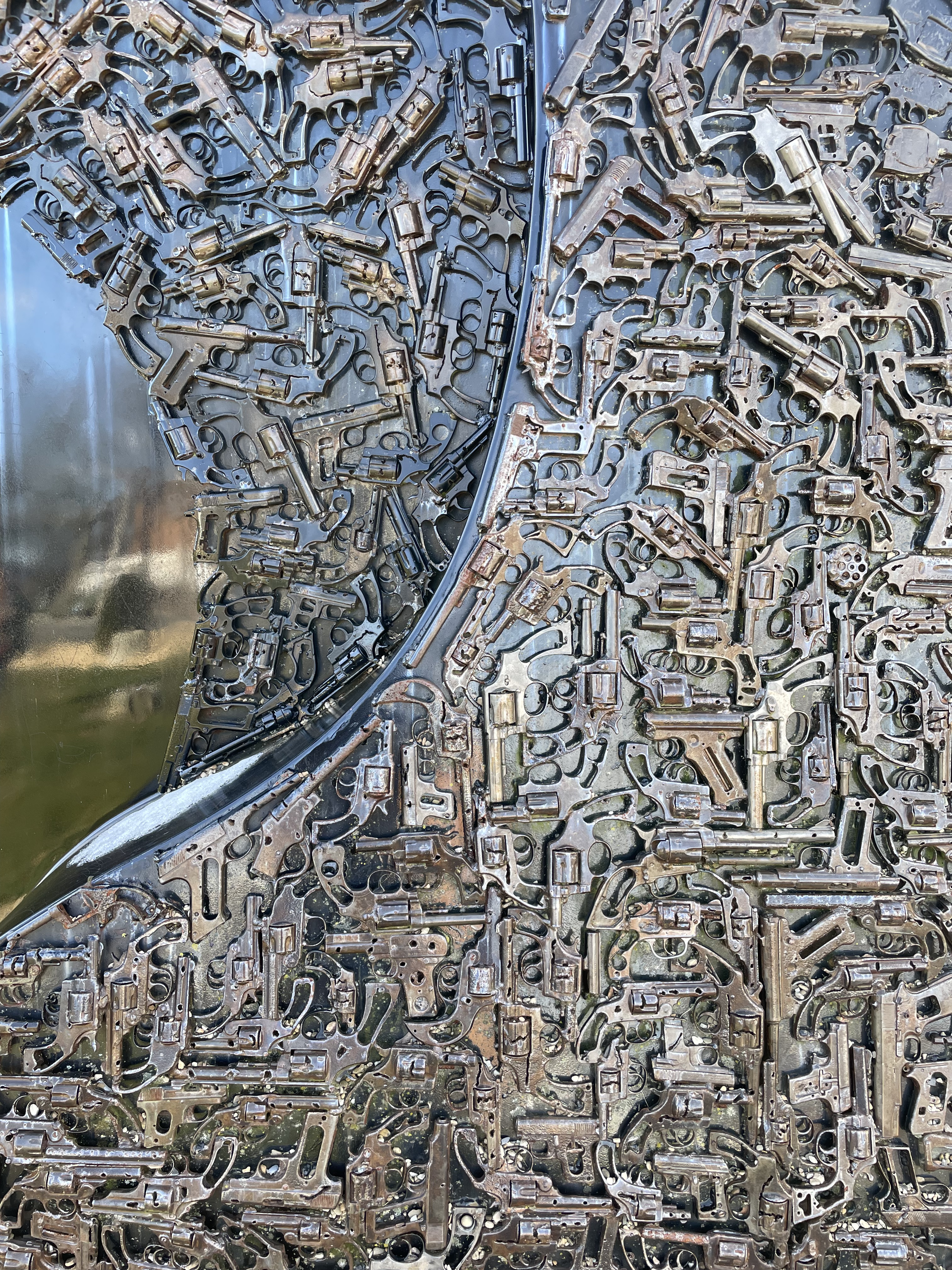
A close-up shot of the handguns incorporated into the sculpture Guns into Plowshares

The guns were originally slated to be melted down for use in fences, but the Augsburgers convinced the police chief to disable the guns, including semi-automatic TEC-9s and Smith & Wesson revolvers, and allow them to be used in the project.

The sculpture took three years to complete at a cost of $125,000. It was installed on August 20, 1997, in Judiciary Square, outside D.C. police headquarters. After remaining there for over a decade, the sculpture was moved into storage in 2008 during a renovation of the D.C. Historic Courthouse nearby. In January 2011, it was installed near a police evidence management facility in D.C.

On October 10, 2017, after having been returned to storage for some time, the sculpture was refurbished and moved to the campus of Eastern Mennonite University in Harrisonburg, Virginia, where another of Esther's sculptures, Love Essence, also stands. Esther was the first student to graduate from the school with an art degree, and her husband Myron was president of the school between 1965 and 1980.

In February 2025, the sculpture was moved back to D.C., on Martin Luther King Jr. Avenue in Ward 8, where gun violence has long been prevalent.

== Religious context ==
Esther Augsburger regards her artwork as an expression of her Mennonite religious commitments. Yet for most of their history, the Mennonites (a branch of Anabaptist Christianity named for Menno Simons) had no strong tradition of artmaking. The tradition placed a high value on what is considered a "plain" or "simple" form of life, which involved a rejection of decoration or ornament. Many Mennonites also objected to the use of images in worship. What aesthetic tradition they did develop therefore focused on functional household objects like quilts and furniture.

In the latter half of the 20th century, however, a new tradition of distinctively Mennonite art began to emerge. The growth of this tradition was visible in both Mennonite literature and the visual arts. Esther Augsburger belongs to this new tradition. She was the first graduate of the newly formed studio art program at Eastern Mennonite University in 1972, and she went on to produce sculptures recognized both nationally and internationally. Much of her work, like Guns into Plowshares, attests to traditional Mennonite values, especially a commitment to service and nonviolence.

== Reception ==
One early story about the sculpture reported some confusion about its meaning, but its reception by local residents has generally been positive. It has been cited in scholarly discussion about Isaiah 2:4 and in homiletic resources for pastors who are preaching on the passage. In the wake of the February 2018 Stoneman Douglas High School shooting in Parkland, Florida, the sculpture became the site of a vigil for those who had died.
