= Wadsworth Institute =

Coordinates: 41.0260°N 81.7392°W

Wadsworth Institute was a Mennonite seminary in Wadsworth, Ohio, from 1868 to 1878. Officially named the "Christian Educational Institution of the Mennonite Denomination", it accepted men aged 18 to 35 for a three-year program centering on biblical studies and other topics relevant to training pastors and mission workers. Starting in 1876, women were accepted as day students. Classes were primarily taught in German and some in English.

Instruction was divided among three departments: theology, German and English. The theology department classes covered biblical and church history, biblical theology, doctrine symbolics, catechism instruction and homiletics. Classes in the German department included reading, writing, grammar, spelling, composition and world history. The English department taught a wide variety of subjects including reading, writing, orthography, grammar, geography, arithmetic, analysis of sentences, rhetoric, logic, elementary algebra, higher algebra, geometry, trigonometry, physical geography, natural philosophy, physiology, botany, chemistry, history of the United States plus other branches usually found in academies and colleges.

The principal, Carl Justus van der Smissen (1811–1890), was hired from among European Mennonites, who generally had more education than North American Mennonites. Enrollment averaged 34 students annually over its eleven-year history, somewhat over half of whom were Mennonites. The institute produced a generation of Mennonite leaders of the late 19th and early 20th centuries.

In spite of its short history, the institute was a significant development among North American Mennonites. It was the first major cooperative project, involving like-minded Mennonites from Ontario, Pennsylvania, Ohio and states west to Iowa. The process of promoting, raising funds and building the school was one of the uniting points of the fledgling General Conference Mennonite Church. It represented a significant departure from an anti-education tradition and opened the way for trained and paid ministers within the church. The school broadened the views of its students who, in turn, helped move their congregations away from insular practices of the past. The promotion of missions generated the first Mennonite mission workers from North America.

Conflicts between van der Smissen and other key staff members developed, but the school's end was largely a result of low attendance, financial difficulty and debt. The supporting churches had two other concerns dividing their resources: new mission projects and eighteen thousand Russian Mennonite immigrants who were arriving in North America. In 1878 the building and property were sold in order to meet the institute's financial obligations. Wadsworth laid the groundwork for future General Conference Mennonite Church seminaries: Halstead Seminary (1883) the forerunner of Bethel College, Witmarsum Theological Seminary (1914–1931) part of Bluffton College and Mennonite Biblical Seminary (1945) now Associated Mennonite Biblical Seminary.

The building site eventually became the location of Isham Elementary School, part of the Wadsworth public school system. The original 360-kilogram (790 lb) bell from the building's cupola was moved to Associated Mennonite Biblical Seminary in 2002.
