= Funkites =

Funkites (1778 to c.1850) were a group of Mennonite (Anabaptist) followers that splintered from mainstream Mennonites as the result of a schism caused by Bishop Christian Funk.

The Funkite congregation formed during the late 18th century when the colonies were building support to separate from English rule. A Mennonite Bishop, Christian Funk of Franconia Township, Pennsylvania, spoke in favor of supporting the movement. Bishop Funk realized that Mennonites as well as other Anabaptists departed Europe due to religious persecution, and he feared that if this new country would fall under European rule that religious persecution would continue. He preached that Mennonites should stand up to support revolution against European rule and dominance. Otherwise everything they gained might be lost. This went against the doctrines held by Mennonites of non-violence, pacifism, and refusal to swear oaths (including those of allegiance). Another issue which Funk advocated was the support of the revolutionary war tax. Again, this was contrary to Mennonite doctrines.

In an effort to break away from English dominance and in supporting religious freedom in the colonies, Bishop Funk stated that Mennonites should pay the war tax. Fellow Bishops tried to change Funk's mind but failed. Funk's refusal resulted in being ordered to step down as Bishop. Unable to accept this decision, Funk was excommunicated in 1778. He and approximately 52 of his followers splintered from the main congregation and formed a separate Mennonite group known as Funkites. This was the first schism among the Mennonites in America.

This was quite a serious turning point for the Mennonite religion and culture in the new world. Never before did anything so serious cause a break-up of the church, and among Mennonites who had suffered persecution together in Germany and Switzerland, not too many years earlier.

On Bishop Christian Funk's death in 1811, the congregation continued to worship in four locations near Evansburg, Lower Providence Township, Pennsylvania, until 1850 when the last of the Funkites died out. A memorial to Christian Funk is located at the Funkite Cemetery near Evansburg, Pennsylvania. The cemetery contains 32 markers, the earliest dating from 1815.
