= International Bulletin of Mission Research =

Academic journal

- Discipline: Missiology
- Language: English
- Edited by: Thomas J. Hastings

Publication details
- Former name(s): Occasional Bulletin from the Missionary Research Library, International Bulletin of Missionary Research
- History: 1950-present
- Publisher: SAGE Publications for the Overseas Ministries Study Center (United States)
- Frequency: Quarterly

Standard abbreviations
- ISO 4: Int. Bull. Mission Res.

Indexing
- ISSN: 0272-6122
- OCLC no.: 6882616

Links
- Journal homepage; Journal at Sage Online

The International Bulletin of Mission Research (or IBMR) is an academic journal covering mission studies and world Christianity, published by the Overseas Ministries Study Center (OMSC).

== History ==
IBMR was established in 1950 by R. Pierce Beaver as the Occasional Bulletin from the Missionary Research Library at Union Theological Seminary, New York. It started to publish quarterly since January 1977, under the name International Bulletin of Missionary Research, with the initiatives of Gerald H. Anderson, director of the OMSC between 1976 and 2000. The journal changed its name again in 2016 from the International Bulletin of Missionary Research to the International Bulletin of Mission Research, to account for the global shift in world Christianity. The current editor is Thomas J. Hastings.
