= Ralphi – Der Schlaubär aus der Augsburger Puppenkiste =

- Country of origin: Germany

Ralphi – Der Schlaubär aus der Augsburger Puppenkiste is a German television series.

== See also ==
- List of German television series
