= Conrad Grebel University College =

Canadian college in Waterloo, Ontario

- Type: Public
- Established: 1963; 63 years ago
- Parent institution: University of Waterloo
- Religious affiliation: Mennonite Church Eastern Canada
- Academic affiliations: Toronto School of Theology
- President: Marcus Shantz
- Undergraduates: 142
- Location: 140 Westmount Road North, Waterloo, Ontario, Canada; 43°27′59″N 80°32′43″W
- Campus: Urban/Suburban
- Colours: Red and white
- Mascot: Conrad the Cookie
- Website: grebel.ca

Conrad Grebel University College (or simply Grebel; pronounced "grey-bull") is a liberal arts university college affiliated with the University of Waterloo in Waterloo, Ontario, Canada. It is affiliated with the Mennonite Church Canada.

The college is named after Conrad Grebel, a co-founder of the Swiss Brethren movement who is called the "Father of Anabaptists".

== History ==
Starting in the late 1950s, discussions among Harvey W. Taves (Director of the Canadian office of the Mennonite Central Committee) and others occurred with the purpose of establishing a college undergirded by the peace commitment of the Mennonite church. Following the founding of Conrad Grebel College in 1963, Taves served as secretary of the board for several years. In 2001, it became a university.

An Act respecting Conrad Grebel University College was assented to June 24, 2004.

== Facilities ==
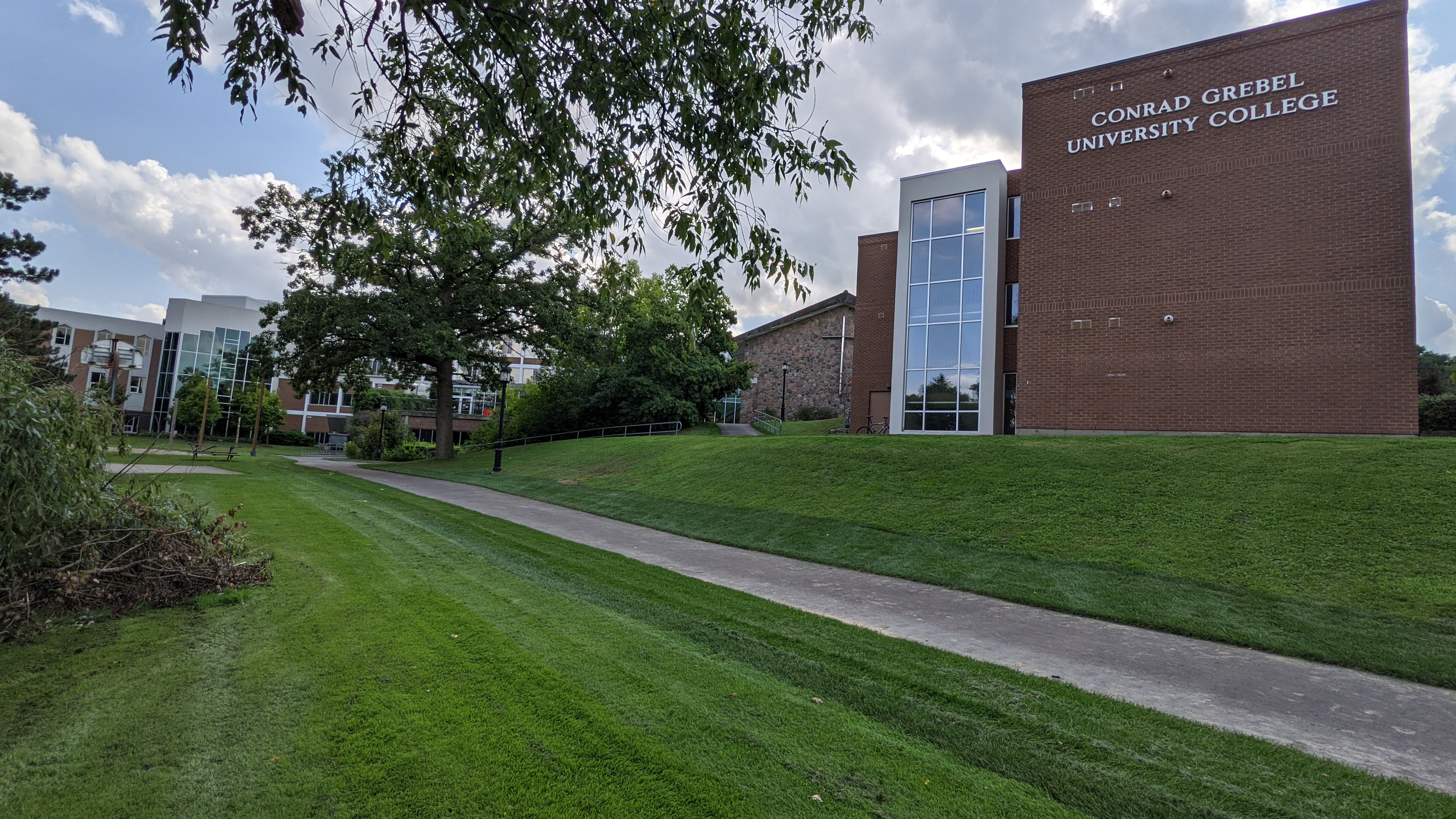
Grebel's on-campus apartment building

Grebel is located next to the University of Waterloo and offers residence and classes for students. The facility has space in residence for 140 students, as well as an on-campus apartment building which houses an additional 32 students.

Along with classrooms, Grebel's academic wing is home to the Milton Good Library and the Kindred Credit Union Centre for Peace Advancement.

== Ensembles ==
Many music ensembles are run by the Conrad Grebel University College, including: Orchestra @UWaterloo, instrumental chamber ensembles, jazz ensemble, Balinese gamelan ensemble, and choirs. These ensembles are open to students in the music programs or those outside of the College.

Since 2003, the Grebel community has put on a musical once every two years. In 2025, they performed the first Canadian production of The Clockmaker's Daughter.

== Scholarships and bursaries ==
The Government of Canada sponsors an Aboriginal Bursaries Search Tool that lists over 680 scholarships, bursaries, and other incentives offered by governments, universities, and industry to support Aboriginal post-secondary participation. Conrad Grebel University College scholarships for Aboriginal, First Nations and Métis students include: Sundance Aboriginal Student Award

== Media ==
The college runs the Conrad Grebel Review, a peer-reviewed journal of Christian inquiry from broadly-based Anabaptist/Mennonite perspectives. It is published three times a year.

Grebel also has a student-run publication, currently titled GrebelSpeaks, and previously titled Rabble. This publication is by and for Grebel residents, apartment-dwellers, and associates.

== Relationship with the University of Waterloo ==
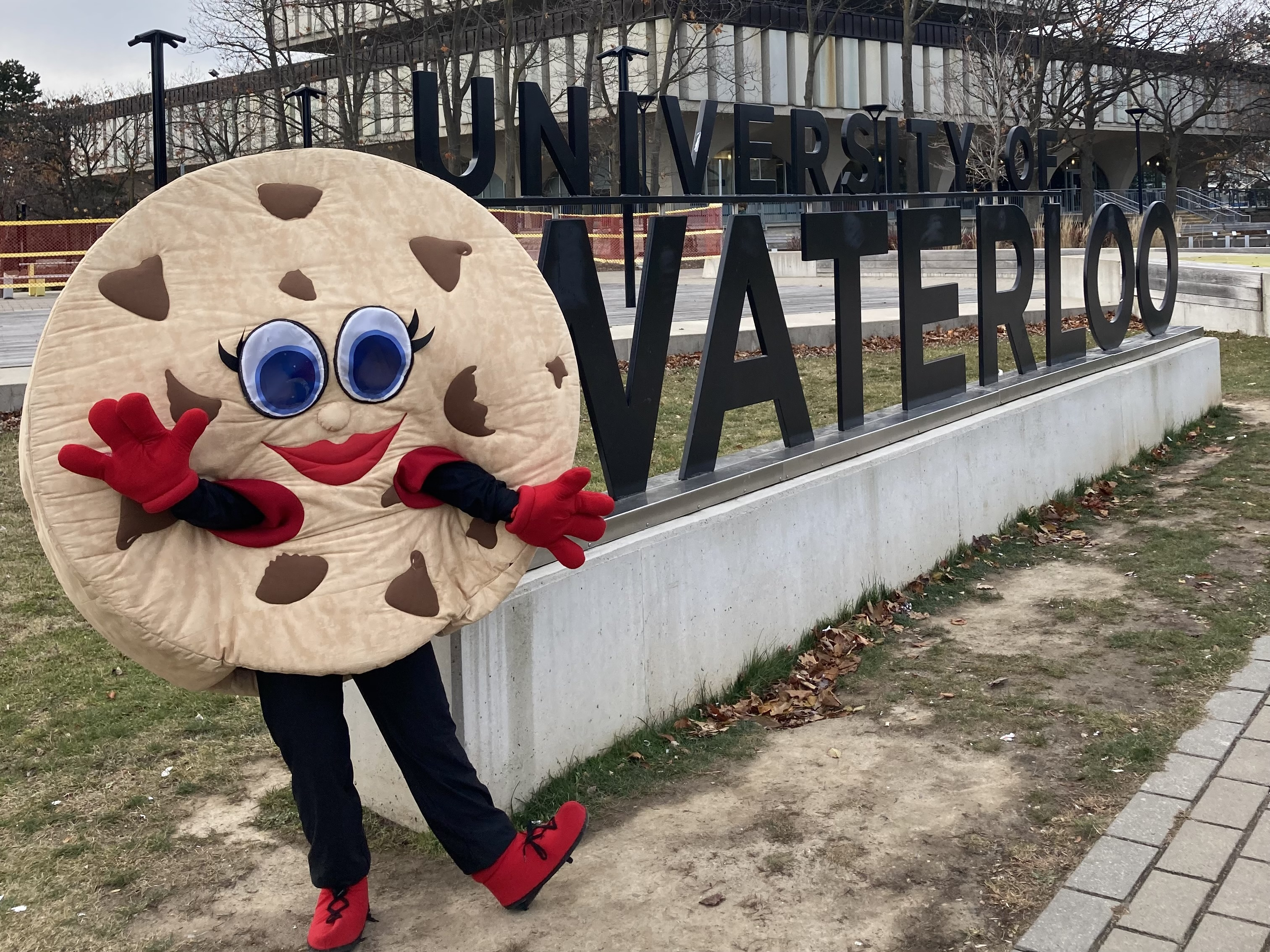
Grebel's mascot, Conrad the Cookie, in front of the University of Waterloo sign

Undergraduate students at Conrad Grebel, and all of the other university colleges surrounding the central university, are registered at, take classes at, and graduate from the University of Waterloo. Specialized classes are available from Conrad Grebel, which has an academic focus on Music, Peace and Conflict Studies, Religious Studies, and Mennonite Studies. Courses from Grebel may be taken by any University of Waterloo student, and are taught by Grebel professors at the Grebel college, but count as credit at the University of Waterloo.

At the graduate level, Grebel offers a Master of Peace and Conflict Studies program as well as a Master of Theological Studies program

== Community ==
Conrad Grebel University college places a strong emphasis on community. This is both a reflection of founding Mennonite values and of the small size of the college. Because of Grebel's small size (at most 140 residence students, 32 Apartment residents per term in addition to a number of off-campus associates) and emphasis on providing room for upper year students, most of the students know most of the other students in residence. Relationships with others are encouraged through Snack Nights, regular chapel services, and a weekly Community Supper at which the entire residence community, as well as some associate students and faculty and staff gather for a more formal dinner. Conrad Grebel University College is also affiliated with the Inter-Mennonite Children's Choir.

== See also ==
- Higher education in Ontario
- List of universities in Ontario
- Canadian Interuniversity Sport
- Canadian government scientific research organizations
- Canadian university scientific research organizations
- Canadian industrial research and development organizations
- List of colleges and universities named after people
