= Mennonite Church Canada =

Anabaptist denomination

- Église mennonite du Canada
- Abbreviation: MC Canada
- Classification: Anabaptist
- Orientation: Mennonite
- Polity: Congregational
- Associations: Canadian Council of Churches, Evangelical Fellowship of Canada, Mennonite World Conference
- Region: Canada
- Origin: 2002
- Merger of: The General Conference Mennonite Church, Mennonite Church, Conference of Mennonites in Canada
- Congregations: 202
- Members: 23,992
- Missionary organization: Mennonite Mission Network
- Aid organization: Mennonite Central Committee
- Official website: mennonitechurch.ca

The Mennonite Church Canada (MC Canada; French: Église mennonite du Canada), informally known as the General Conference (French: Conférence générale), is a Mennonite denomination in Canada, with head offices in Winnipeg, Manitoba. It is a member of the Mennonite World Conference and the Evangelical Fellowship of Canada.

== History ==
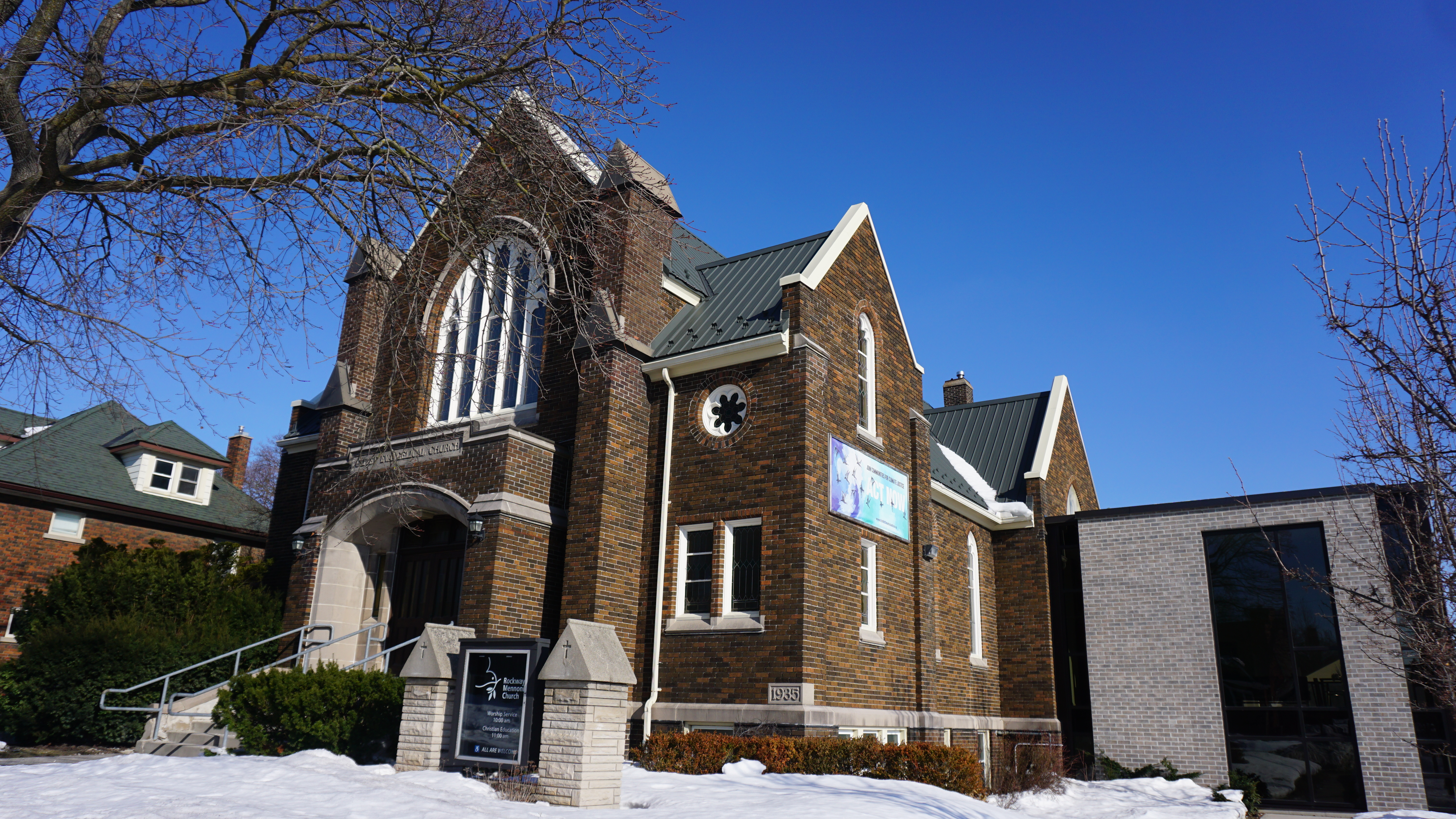
Rockway Mennonite Church, Kitchener, Ontario.

The first Mennonites in Canada arrived from Pennsylvania in 1786. The majority of the Mennonites that migrated to Canada over the next 150 years came directly from Europe. The first annual meeting of Mennonite ministers was held in 1810, which eventually led to founding the Mennonite Conference of Ontario (later the Mennonite Conference of Ontario and Quebec). The Conference of Mennonites in Central Canada was formed in 1903. When other bodies arriving in Canada began to settle outside this "central" base, the name was changed to the General Conference of Mennonites in Canada in 1932 (later the Conference of Mennonites in Canada). The Ontario Amish Mennonite Conference (later Western Ontario Mennonite Conference) was founded in 1923, and the Conference of United Mennonite Churches in Ontario in 1945. In 1988, the Western Ontario Mennonite Conference, the Conference of United Mennonite Churches in Ontario and the Mennonite Conference of Ontario and Quebec united to form the Mennonite Conference of Eastern Canada.

Beginning in 1989, a series of consultations, discussions, proposals, and sessions led to the unification of two North American bodies (the Mennonite Church & General Conference Mennonite Church) and the related Canadian Conference of Mennonites in Canada into the Mennonite Church USA and the Mennonite Church Canada in 2002.

According to a census published in 2025 by the Mennonite World Conference, it would have 202 churches and 23,992 baptized members.

== Beliefs ==
The doctrinal faith of the Mennonite Church Canada is set forth in The Confession of Faith in a Mennonite Perspective. This confession was adopted in 1995 by the General Conference Mennonite Church and the Mennonite Church at Wichita, Kansas. It contains 24 articles on the following: "God; Jesus Christ; Holy Spirit; Scripture; Creation and Divine Providence; the Creation and Calling of Human Beings; Sin; Salvation; The Church of Jesus Christ; The Church in Mission; Baptism; The Lord's Supper; Foot Washing; Discipline in the Church; Ministry and Leadership; Church Order and Unity; Discipleship and the Christian Life; Christian Spirituality; Family, Singleness, and Marriage; Truth and the Avoidance of Oaths; Christian Stewardship; Peace, Justice, and Nonresistance; The Church's Relation to Government and Society; and The Reign of God."

The church ordains women as pastors.

=== Marriage ===
In 2016, it voted in favor of a resolution giving each local church the choice of celebrating blessings of same-sex marriage.

In 2019, progressive churches founded the In This Together Network for the inclusion of LGBTQ people.

In This Together Network brings together 46 churches by 2025 that support blessings of same-sex marriage.

== Structure ==
The organizational structure of the Mennonite Church Canada is divided into five Area Churches - Mennonite Church Alberta, Mennonite Church British Columbia, Mennonite Church Eastern Canada, Mennonite Church Manitoba, and Mennonite Church Saskatchewan. Denominational work is administered through a board elected by the delegates to the biennial assembly. Mennonite Church Canada participates in the Canadian Council of Churches, the Evangelical Fellowship of Canada, and the Mennonite World Conference.

== Schools ==
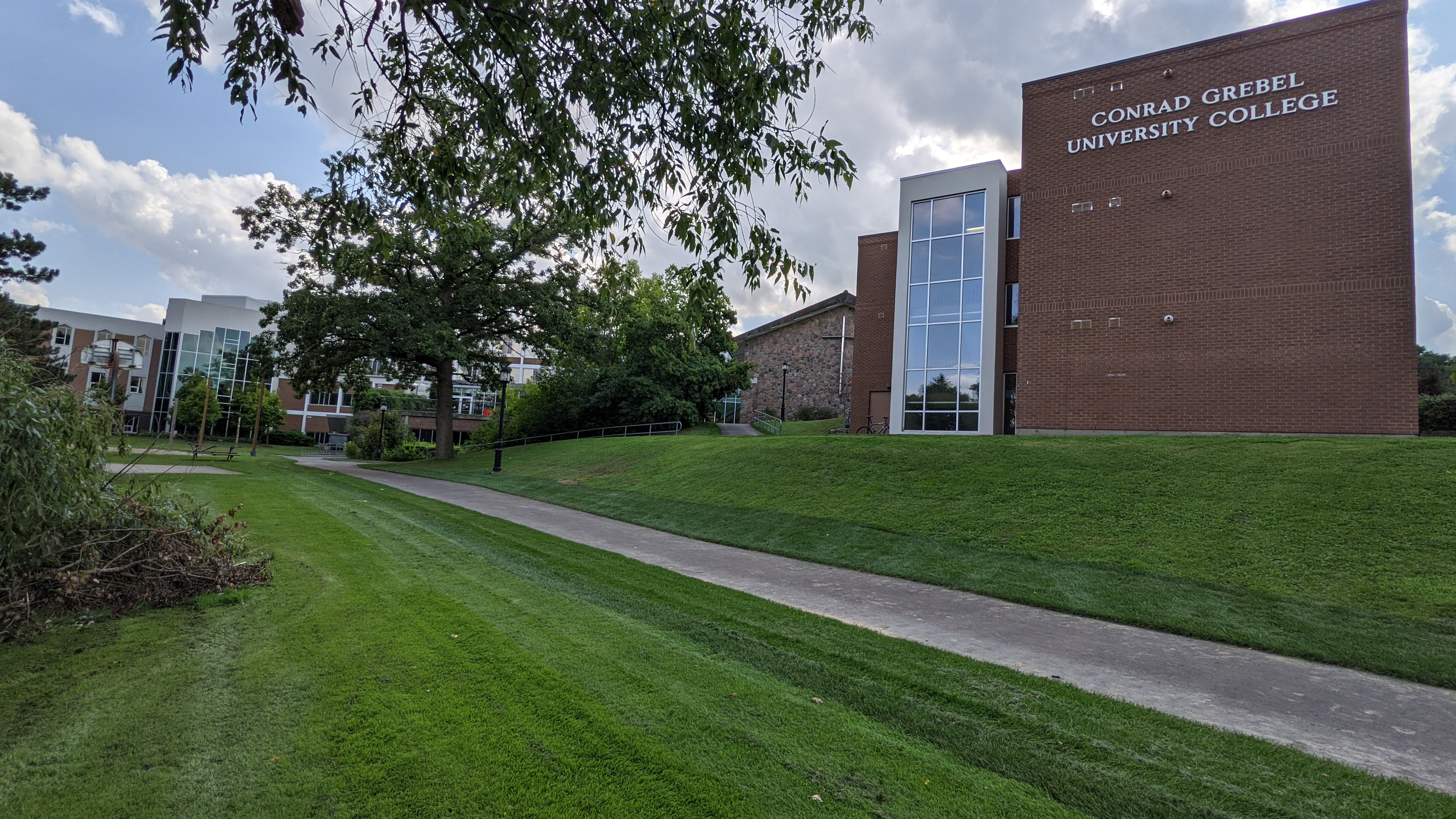
Conrad Grebel University College in Waterloo, Ontario.

It has 2 theological institutes, the Columbia Bible College in Abbotsford, British Columbia, and the Anabaptist Mennonite Biblical Seminary in Elkhart, in Indiana (United States).

It has 2 universities, the Conrad Grebel University College in Waterloo, Ontario and the Canadian Mennonite University in Winnipeg (Manitoba).

== Periodical ==
Canadian Mennonite is the official conference periodical. The conference also published the German-language Der Bote newspaper until 2008, when it ceased publication.
