= Eastern Mennonite Seminary =

Coordinates: 38.4701°N 78.8813°W

Eastern Mennonite Seminary (EMS) is the graduate theological division of Eastern Mennonite University (EMU), which is an accredited Christian liberal arts university in Harrisonburg, Virginia. EMU was established as Eastern Mennonite College in 1917. In 1965, after several decades of growth and change on the Harrisonburg campus, the seminary was re-established with its formal name and an acting dean. EMS was an outgrowth of the curriculum in Bible at what was then known as Eastern Mennonite College. EMU and EMS together are considered the embodiment of a vision held by the Mennonite leaders from Virginia, Maryland and Pennsylvania who first established EMC in 1917.

The seminary is an accredited member of the Association of Theological Schools in the United States and Canada since 1986. In addition to training leaders for in the Mennonite Church USA, EMS is approved as an institution for the training of candidates for ordination in the United Methodist Church. Eligible students may receive educational benefits from the Veterans Administration.
