= Anabaptist Mennonite Biblical Seminary =

Protestant seminary in Elkhart, Indiana, US

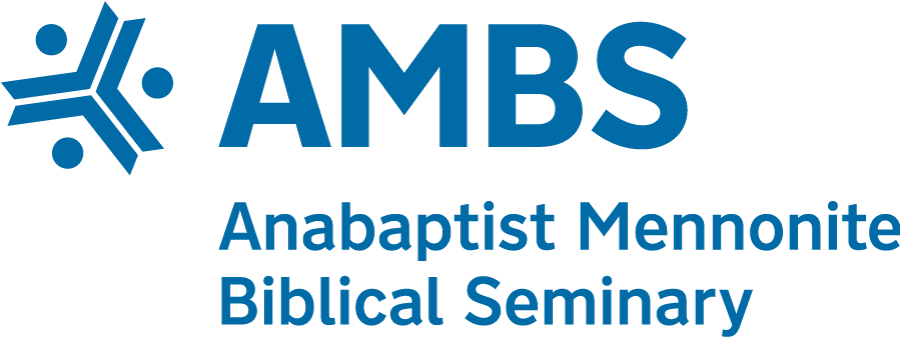
- Other name: AMBS
- Former name: Associated Mennonite Biblical Seminary
- Type: Seminary
- Established: 1958
- Accreditation: Association of Theological Schools
- Religious affiliation: Mennonite Church Canada; Mennonite Church USA
- Endowment: $212.66 million (2024)
- Chair: James Gunden
- President: David Boshart
- Academic staff: 12
- Students: 132
- Location: Elkhart, Indiana, US; 41.656355°N 85.971129°W
- Campus: 44 acres (18 ha)
- Website: ambs.edu

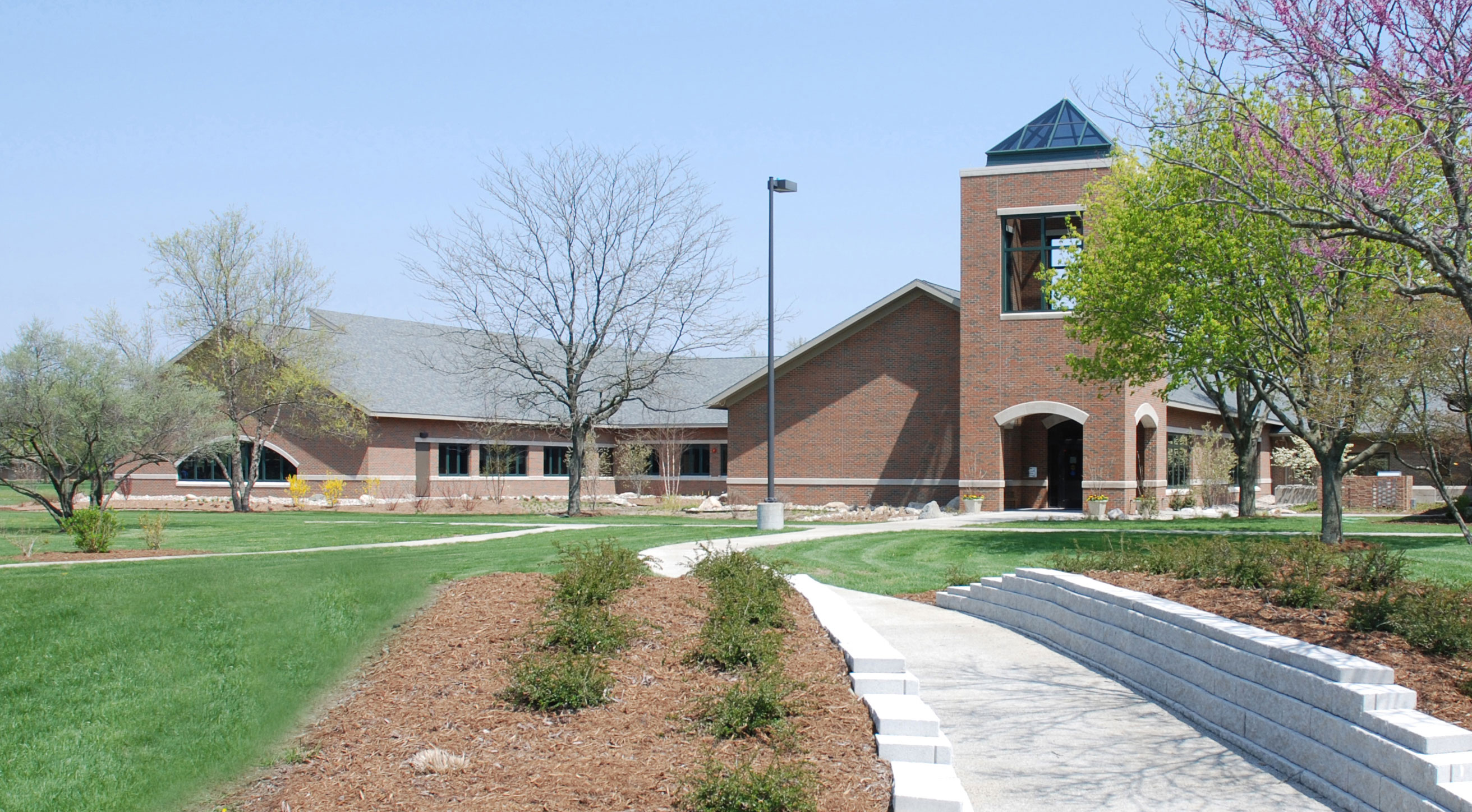
AMBS library wing

Anabaptist Mennonite Biblical Seminary (AMBS) is an Anabaptist Christian seminary in Elkhart, Indiana, affiliated with Mennonite Church USA and Mennonite Church Canada. It was formerly known as Associated Mennonite Biblical Seminary until its name was changed in 2012.

The seminary offers a three-year Master of Divinity degree and two-year Master of Arts degree. It is accredited by the Association of Theological Schools in the United States and Canada.

== History ==
Anabaptist Mennonite Biblical Seminary has roots in two former Mennonite seminaries: Goshen Biblical Seminary of the Mennonite Church and Mennonite Biblical Seminary of the General Conference Mennonite Church.

=== Goshen Biblical Seminary ===
Goshen Biblical Seminary at Goshen College, a Mennonite Church school in Goshen, Indiana, was one of two institutions that joined to form AMBS. Goshen Biblical Seminary was the direct continuation of the Bible School that began at Elkhart Institute in Elkhart, Indiana in 1894, while Elkhart Institute was organized as an academy. In 1903, Elkhart Institute moved to Goshen, Indiana, became Goshen College, and was reorganized as a junior college; in 1910 Goshen College was reorganized as a senior college. From 1894 until 1933, the Bible School offered a two-year course of study leading to a diploma and served as the Bible department of the college. In 1933, the Bible School began offering a four-year ThB (Bachelor of Theology), which expanded to a five-year course in 1942. In 1944, the Bible School was organized as a separate school with its own dean. In 1946, the school began using the name Goshen Biblical Seminary and began offering a seven-year BD (Bachelor of Divinity) with four years of liberal arts and three years of Bible and theology. In 1949, a BRE (Bachelor of Religious Education) was added as a four-year program. In 1955, the Th.B. program was discontinued and the seminary was organized into graduate and undergraduate divisions.

Harold S. Bender served as dean of the college and Bible School from 1931. Bender became dean of the seminary in 1944 when it was organized as a separate school and served until his death in 1962. In 1953–54, 67 students were enrolled. The total number of graduates from 1934 to 1956 was 190, with over 380 having matriculated. Goshen Biblical Seminary began aligning its academic program with that of Mennonite Biblical Seminary in 1958 and moved from Goshen to Mennonite Biblical Seminary's Elkhart campus after 1969.

=== Mennonite Biblical Seminary ===
Mennonite Biblical Seminary (MBS), a General Conference Mennonite Church institution in Chicago, Illinois, was the second school that became part of AMBS. The General Conference Mennonites had a history of educating pastors and church leaders which started with Wadsworth Institute (1868–1878), then Halstead Seminary (1883) the forerunner of Bethel College and Witmarsum Theological Seminary (1914–1931), part of Bluffton College.

The Witmarsum school closed in 1931 for what was assumed to be a year or two during which a better location could be found and an association with an older seminary arranged. This would last until 1945 when a Chicago, Illinois, site was selected and an affiliation with Bethany Biblical Seminary was established.

Mennonite Biblical Seminary was opened in September 1945 and used available space at Bethany for classes and student housing. By the fall of 1946 the seminary purchased property on the 4600 block of Woodlawn Avenue as it prepared for more students who were expected with the end of Civilian Public Service. Over the next six years most of the property on that block would become part of the Seminary.

The school operated with five full-time faculty and two part-time administrative staff members. After the startup years, student enrollment averaged about 40 with about nine degrees granted each year. Each year about a dozen Mennonite students who were attending other Chicago schools were allowed to use Seminary apartments.

In 1953, MBS worked together with Goshen Biblical Seminary to create a joint summer school for the following year. As this friendly exchange progressed throughout the next several years a desire for a larger inter-Mennonite seminary developed. This process was culminated in 1958 by which time the Chicago property had been sold and the Seminary moved to a new joint campus in Indiana.

=== Association ===
After the success of the 1954 cooperative summer school, the Goshen and Chicago seminaries started seriously exploring closer cooperation. Other Mennonite denominations were invited to explore what was hoped to be a larger inter-Mennonite school. Although the Evangelical Mennonite Church, Mennonite Brethren, Evangelical Mennonite Brethren and Brethren in Christ all showed initial interest, each of these bodies ultimately opted not to pursue this type of partnership.

A plan was devised where each school would operate independently at a single site, sharing a library, a few joint courses, joint chapel services once a week and joint use of certain facilities. It was felt that the two denominations' respective constituencies would support this new venture only if the schools remained independent. This arrangement of two parallel schools is evident in the school's original plural name: Associated Mennonite Biblical Seminaries.

The largest sticking point in the negotiations was selecting a suitable location. Although Bethel College in Kansas offered a site, this option was never seriously considered. The Goshen group wanted the seminary to be located on their existing campus at Goshen College in Indiana, believing their church members would not support a move. The General Conference Mennonites rejected this site for fear of being swallowed up by the larger group. Eventually an Elkhart, Indiana, site was chosen as a neutral location between the two schools.

Ground breaking at the Elkhart property took place on September 3, 1957, and was essentially completed by the next August. A chapel was added and dedicated in June 1965.

The Goshen Seminary received Association of Theological Schools accreditation in 1958 and Mennonite Biblical Seminary followed with accreditation in 1964.

Over the years closer cooperation eventually eliminated the distinction between the two schools, and by 1994 they formally merged into the (now-singular) Associated Mennonite Biblical Seminary. By 2002 the two Mennonite denominations themselves had joined to form a common structure, in which decades of cooperation between the two groups at AMBS had played a role.

== Beliefs ==
The school has an inclusion policy which values the diversity of students.

== Institute of Mennonite Studies ==
The Institute of Mennonite Studies (IMS) is the research and publishing arm of Anabaptist Mennonite Biblical Seminary. The institute has fostered inter-Mennonite connections and scholarship advances in the areas of Anabaptist theology and history since 1958. Key Mennonite leaders such as theologian John Howard Yoder have been associated with IMS. The current director of IMS is Jamie Pitts.

== Notable alumni ==
- Steven Nolt, professor

== Notable faculty (past and present) ==
- Alan Kreider
- J. C. Wenger
- John Howard Yoder

== Library ==
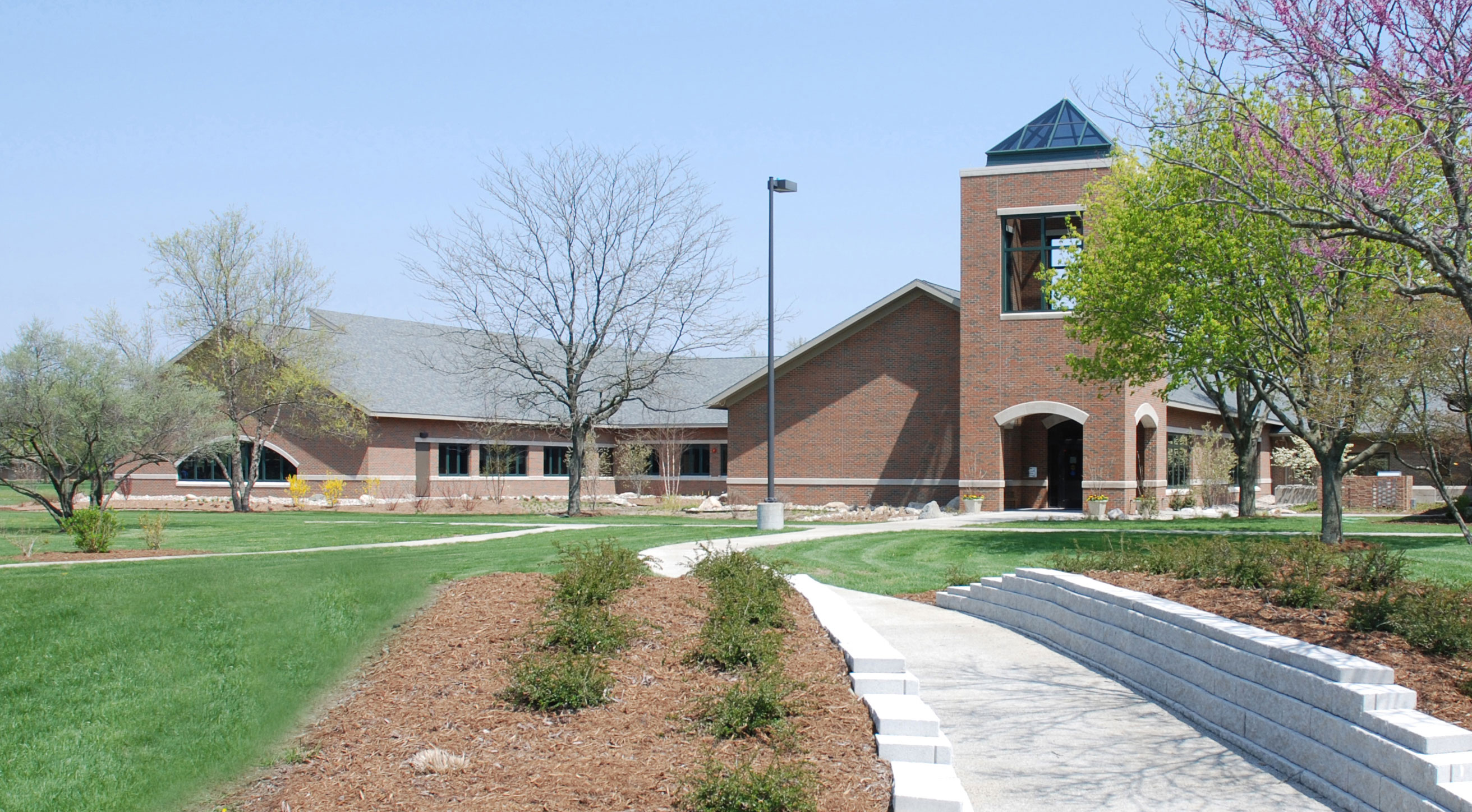
AMBS library and bookstore building.

In 2007, AMBS completed a new building to house the library and bookstore. This building was the first theological library registered with the United States Green Building Council for Leadership in Energy and Environmental Design (LEED) certification. The building received a LEED Gold rating in 2009.

The library construction included the installation of a "green landscape," including rain gardens surrounding most of the library's exterior and a prairie restoration project that restored significant portions of the campus ground to its original tall-grass prairie.

In 2014, the library reported that it had 113,296 books and media in its physical library collections and 5754 books, databases, and media in its electronic library collections.
