= Franconia Mennonite Conference =

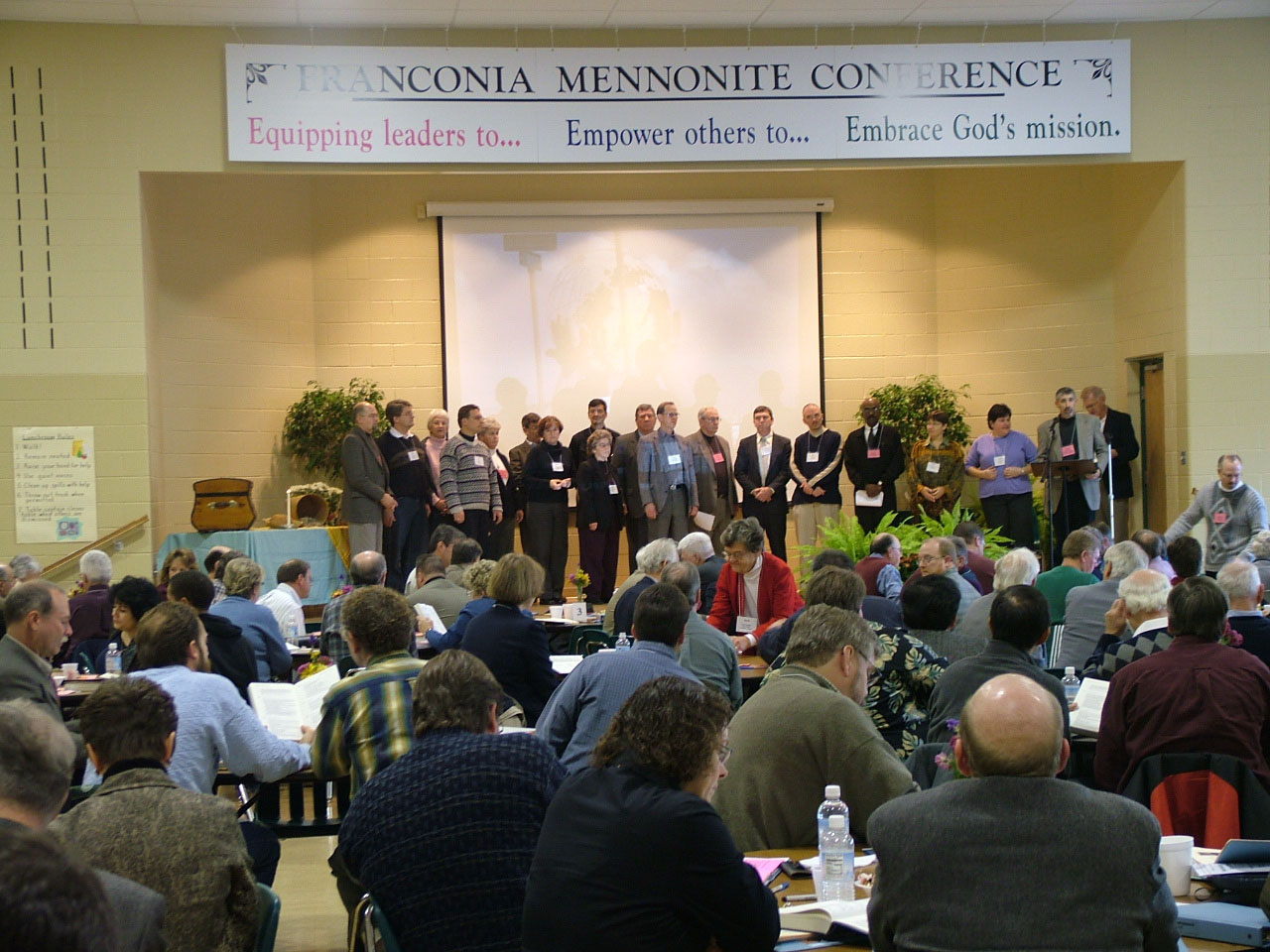
Franconia Mennonite Conference welcomes new ministers at a November meeting.

Franconia Mennonite Conference was a conference of Mennonite Church USA based in Lansdale, Pennsylvania, with 45 congregations in Pennsylvania, New Jersey, Vermont, New York and California and 19 conference related ministries. In February 2020, Franconia Mennonite Conference merged with Eastern District Conference to become Mosaic Mennonite Conference. It is a member of Mennonite World Conference.

== History ==
As the oldest Mennonite body in America, Franconia Conference is a three-century-old Mennonite “congregation of congregations” in southeastern Pennsylvania. Comprising about fifty congregations with some 7,000 members, it dates the arrival of its first members at Germantown near Philadelphia in 1683, and the first baptisms a quarter-century later in 1708.

The caution which delayed the first baptisms is symbolic of the desire for authentic church order, characteristic of the Franconia tradition. The act of conferring is at the heart of the historic Mennonite concern to “give and receive counsel” in the fellowship or body of Christ’s followers. Thus, Mennonites have found the English term “conference”—used by Methodists since 1744—as the best equivalent for the German term Rath (counsel), originally used in this community of immigrants from Germany, Switzerland and the Netherlands. 60 miles (100 kilometers) to the west, Mennonite leaders centered in Lancaster County proceeded similarly, using the word Zusammenkunft (gathering).

Drawing on European conferences dating back to 1527, Mennonite bishops who had immigrated to present-day Bucks, Montgomery, Chester and Berks Counties endorsed in 1725 a “brotherly agreement” originally drawn up in the Dutch Republic in 1632 and affirmed by Swiss leaders in 1660. By 1735 the American bishops were conferring repeatedly over new issues in their American environment. Their central concern was how to preserve and keep vital the fundamental issues of non-violent witness to their Christian faith.

The American Revolutionary War tested the bonds of this fellowship as leaders discussed the proper way to express historic Mennonite convictions against participating in warfare and taking oaths. A developing sense of a geographic center shifting from Skippack to Franconia was firmly established by the 1840s. In this era, progressive-minded leaders thrust beyond the protective traditional emphasis on accountability to a freer, more congregational, education-oriented, missional and innovative style of conference. As a result, since 1847, there had been two parallel fellowships. However, after a century and a half of non-fellowship, strong mutual affirmation and cooperation have reappeared. (In 2020, these two conferences completed their reconciliation and merged to become Mosaic Mennonite Conference.)

Without the more progressive element, the original Franconia Conference maintained its traditional, guarded church order, through the Civil War and World War I periods. As the local Pennsylvania German language gave way to English with the dawning of the twentieth century, attempts to guard against change and worldliness produced a codification of traditional rules, and eventually a written constitution. At the same time, as conservative Mennonites began to learn outreach from neighboring Christians, youthful energy broke through into the forming of local mission congregations. Some twenty new congregations appeared from these efforts, ranging from Philadelphia to New England.

A steady growth of institutions began with a retirement home in 1914, followed by a mission board, an “Aid Plan,” a periodical, church schools, and young people entering higher education of all kinds. These changes were further stimulated by the return of young people from widespread voluntary or drafted non-military service in World War II. With the 1950s came mission outreach to Mexico, where conference congregations today have sister fellowships.

Members of Salford Mennonite Church's sister congregation, Dios con Nosotros.

As the written code of rules gave way in the 1960s to more congregational initiatives and discernment, the original role of bishops changed from that of control to that of counsel and encouragement. This was finally folded into a concept of “conference” that was more supportive and administrative than controlling. Nevertheless, a sense of responsibility for maintaining faithful scriptural standards has fostered a continuing credentialing for ministry of all sorts. Access to the heritage of faith is available in archives sponsored jointly with the “Eastern District Conference” that emerged in 1847.

In the 1970s, the older usage of “conference” as the collective body of ordained persons changed in the direction of “assembly,” with strong involvement by lay members, new leadership roles for women, and the increase presence of many non-ethnic Mennonites, but a church fellowship they had espoused for its concern to follow Christ.

Room was made where desired for charismatic motifs, more congregational initiative, and overhaul of traditional structures. In connection with the larger Mennonite denomination, a “Confession of Faith in a Mennonite Perspective (1995) was accepted, along with membership, in the year 2000, in a joint “Mennonite Church USA.”

In the 1990's, Franconia Conference had trouble dealing with issues of sexual orientation and gender identity, with one of its congregations fully embracing lesbian, gay, bisexual, and transgender persons. The conference removed Germantown Mennonite Church from its membership in 1997, as the conference tried to remain faithful to the Bible, and in 2009 began the process of removing Alpha Mennonite Church of New Jersey for standing with its openly gay pastor. Alpha eventually changed pastors and remains with the conference.

During the late 1950s a couple of ministers and lay people alike withdrew to join the Conservative Mennonites which were concentrated more in Lancaster County.
