= National Register of Historic Places listings in Harvey County, Kansas =

Location of Harvey County in Kansas

This is a list of the National Register of Historic Places listings in Harvey County, Kansas.

This is intended to be a complete list of the properties and districts on the National Register of Historic Places in Harvey County, Kansas, United States. The locations of National Register properties and districts for which the latitude and longitude coordinates are included below, may be seen in a map.

There are 24 properties and districts listed on the National Register in the county, including 1 National Historic Landmark.

This National Park Service list is complete through NPS recent listings posted December 12, 2025.

== Current listings ==
| | Name on the Register | Image | Date listed | Location | City or town | Description |
|---|---|---|---|---|---|---|
| 1 | Bergtholdt House | | October 10, 1996 (#96001081) | 205 E. 5th 38°00′34″N 97°30′13″W | Halstead | |
| 2 | Bethel College Administration Building | Bethel College Administration Building | March 16, 1972 (#72000505) | Bethel College campus 38°04′28″N 97°20′32″W | North Newton | |
| 3 | Samuel A. Brown House | | October 17, 1988 (#88001904) | 302 W. 6th 38°02′55″N 97°20′51″W | Newton | |
| 4 | Carnegie Library | Carnegie Library | May 31, 1974 (#74000840) | 203 Main St. 38°02′39″N 97°20′42″W | Newton | |
| 5 | Coleman House | | March 2, 2001 (#01000186) | 408 Mead St. 38°02′01″N 97°20′15″W | Newton | |
| 6 | David Goerz House | | October 31, 2002 (#02001267) | 2512 N. College Ave. 38°04′20″N 97°20′17″W | North Newton | |
| 7 | Halstead Santa Fe Depot | Halstead Santa Fe Depot | October 11, 2001 (#01001094) | 116 E. 1st St. 38°00′21″N 97°30′17″W | Halstead | |
| 8 | E.H. Hoag House | | April 12, 2001 (#01000362) | 303 W. Broadway; 38°03′05″N 97°20′54″W | Newton | |
| 9 | J.J. Krehbiel and Company Carriage Factory | | July 6, 2010 (#10000427) | 128-130 East 6th St. 38°02′56″N 97°20′36″W | Newton | |
| 10 | Lincoln School | | January 13, 2004 (#03001395) | 406 W. 6th St. 38°02′56″N 97°21′03″W | Newton | |
| 11 | McKinley Residential Historic District | | July 9, 2008 (#08000670) | Roughly E. 5th St., SE 3rd St., Allison St., and Walnut St. 38°02′26″N 97°20′38″W | Newton | |
| 12 | Mennonite Settler Statue | Mennonite Settler Statue | February 26, 1998 (#98000084) | Athletic Park Dr. 38°02′45″N 97°21′23″W | Newton | |
| 13 | Jairus Neal House | | May 6, 1982 (#82002661) | 301 E. 4th St. 38°02′45″N 97°20′26″W | Newton | |
| 14 | Newton Main Street Historic District I | | November 15, 2003 (#03001145) | 200 through 214 and 203 through 301 N. Main St. 38°02′48″N 97°20′43″W | Newton | |
| 15 | Newton Main Street Historic District II | Newton Main Street Historic District II | November 15, 2003 (#03001146) | 411-825 N. Main St. and 414-726 N. Main St. 38°02′57″N 97°20′43″W | Newton | |
| 16 | Newton Stadium | Newton Stadium | January 14, 2004 (#03001394) | Athletic Park; 38°02′41″N 97°21′23″W | Newton | |
| 17 | Old Railroad Savings and Loan Building | Old Railroad Savings and Loan Building | May 6, 1982 (#82002662) | 500 Main St. 38°02′52″N 97°20′39″W | Newton | |
| 18 | Santa Fe Depot | Santa Fe Depot | April 11, 1985 (#85000735) | 414 N. Main; 38°02′58″N 97°20′39″W | Newton | |
| 19 | Sedgwick Downtown Historic District | | February 3, 2012 (#11001079) | West side of the 500 block of N. Commercial Ave. 37°55′04″N 97°25′29″W | Sedgwick | |
| 20 | US Post Office-Halstead | | October 17, 1989 (#89001640) | 319 Main St. 38°00′08″N 97°30′22″W | Halstead | |
| 21 | Warkentin House | Warkentin House | January 12, 1970 (#70000250) | 211 E. 1st St. 38°02′36″N 97°20′23″W | Newton | |
| 22 | Warkentin Mill | Warkentin Mill | January 12, 1970 (#70000251) | 3rd and Main Sts. 38°02′43″N 97°20′42″W | Newton | |
| 23 | Bernhard Warkentin Homestead | | February 15, 1974 (#74000839) | North of Halstead; 38°00′27″N 97°30′08″W | Halstead | |
| 24 | Wirkler-Krehbiel House | | January 7, 2015 (#14001119) | 2727 N. Main St. 38°04′28″N 97°20′43″W | North Newton | |

== See also ==
- List of National Historic Landmarks in Kansas
- National Register of Historic Places listings in Kansas
