= Kansas State High School Activities Association =

Sanctioning body for high school activities in Kansas, United States

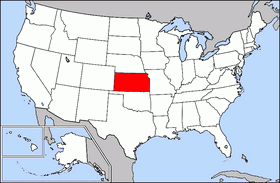
- Abbreviation: KSHSAA
- Formation: 1937
- Type: NPO
- Legal status: Association
- Purpose: Educational Activities & Athletic
- Headquarters: 601 SW Commerce Place; Topeka, Kansas 66615 U.S.
- Region served: Kansas
- Members: 355 high schools 420 middle schools
- Executive Director: Gary Musselman (through June 30, 2018); Bill Faflick (beginning July 1, 2018)
- Affiliations: National Federation of State High School Associations
- Budget: approx. $4 million USD
- Staff: 19
- Website: kshsaa.org
- Remarks: (785) 273-5329

The Kansas State High School Activities Association (KSHSAA) is the organization which oversees interscholastic competition in the U.S. state of Kansas at the high-school level. It oversees both athletic and non-athletic competition, and sponsors championships in several sports and activities.

== History ==
The Kansas State High School Activities Association was formed in 1937 and incorporated in 1956. As early as 1910, Kansas schools organized the statewide Debate League and Athletic Association governed by high school principals. The Athletic Association started as a small voluntary group of fewer than 50 schools and grew to more than 500 schools by the 1920s. Out of necessity, the member schools adopted eligibility and participation rules and established authority for a Board of Control to assess penalties against schools for violations. In 1927 the Board of Control employed the first full-time Executive Secretary. To date, six individuals have served as executive director.

== Classifications ==
KSHSAA divides schools based upon enrollment of grades 9, 10, 11 and 12 for competition and state and regional championships. The largest 32 schools in the state are class 6A, the next largest 32 become 5A, the next 64 become 4A, 3A, and 2A respectively and the remaining schools become class 1A. These classes are re-evaluated every year for all activities except football, with new classifications announced in September after the start of the school year. Ninth grade students were not counted toward the annual classification totals from 1967 to 1968 through 2010–11. In 2013, the 64 schools in class 4A voted to split into two divisions for volleyball, baseball, basketball, softball, and football.

Starting with the 2018–19 school year, Classes 6A, 5A and 4A consist of 36 schools each. Classes 3A and 2A continue to have 64 schools each, while the remaining schools will be in 1A. The two-division format which currently exists in 1A for basketball, scholars bowl and volleyball, and in 4A for baseball, basketball, softball and volleyball, were eliminated; however, the two-division structure in 1A was reinstated by a vote of 1A members for the 2020-21 school year.

Football is evaluated biannually based only upon enrollment for grades 9, 10, and 11, with classifications for the next two seasons announced in October of an odd-numbered year. Schools with 100 or fewer students in grades 9-11 have the option to play Eight-man football instead of the traditional 11-man game. In 11-man football, there are five classes (6A, 5A, 4A, 3A, 2-1A), with 32 schools in 6A and 5A, 64 schools in 4A and 3A, and the remaining schools (43 for 2010 and 2011; 41 for 2012 and 2013) in 2-1A. In eight-man football, there are two divisions of roughly equal size, with 105 schools scheduled to compete in 8-man for the 2010 and 2011 seasons, decreasing to 104 for 2012 and 2013 due to consolidation in many rural towns.

Beginning in 2018, Classes 6A, 5A and 4A will have 32 schools in each classification for football, with the two-division format in 4A eliminated. Classes 3A and 2A will have 48 schools each, and Class 1A will have the remaining 11-man football playing schools (31 in 2018 and 2019). 8-man Division I will be limited to 48 schools, with the remainder in 8-man Division II.

Football classifications were revamped again in 2022. Classes 6A, 5A and 4A remained unchanged, but 3A and 2A were reduced from 48 schools each to 40, with the remaining 11-man schools competing in 1A. This expanded the number of 1A schools from 28 in 2020 and 2021 to 42 in 2022 and 2023. Additionally, the KSHSAA began to sponsor 6-man football in 2022 for schools with 55 students or fewer in grades 9-11 at the time of reclassification.

In April 2025 the KSHSAA Board of Directors approved an adjustment to Rule 35 of its handbook. This change modifies the enrollment classification limits for teams eligible to compete in 8-man and 6-man football. "KSHSAA Handbook Rule 35 now reads: For 8-Player district football participation, assignments shall be limited to those schools with a maximum enrollment of 110 students in grades 9, 10 and 11. For 6-Player district football participation, assignments shall be limited to those schools with a maximum enrollment of 65 students in grades 9, 10 and 11. The change will go into effect for the next football districting cycle" Which in turn makes this change not go into effect until the beginning of the 2026 football season. Prior to the mentioned approved change to Rule 35, the previous maximum enrollment of students in grades 9, 10 and 11 for schools eligible to play 8-man was 100 and for 6-man was 55.

The KSHSAA did not sponsor state championship playoffs for football until 1969. District play was introduced to determine playoff participants in 1981. From 1981 through 2001, only district champions advanced to the playoffs. In 2002, the top two teams in each 11-man district began to qualify for the playoffs; district runners-up were added to the playoff brackets for 8-man in 2004.

In 2016, districts were abolished in Classes 5A and 6A. In those classifications, teams now schedule the first eight games on their own, with the ninth week acting as the first week of the playoffs. Teams are seeded onto the bracket based upon overall record and divided into two groups of 16 based upon geography. Beginning in 2018 the same format was adopted in Class 4A, as well as the top four teams in each district advancing to the playoffs for 8-man.

Schools form leagues to compete against one another, and participation in a particular league is voluntary. Most schools in a league are located within a close geographic range. The most notable example is in Wichita, where the nine high schools within the city limits form the Greater Wichita Athletic League (GWAL, more commonly known as the City League). However, due to sparse population in western Kansas, schools in the same league are often separated by distances of more than 100 miles, and in a few cases, schools are almost 200 miles apart.

In some sports and activities where not all small schools may field a team, classifications are combined for purposes of state championships. For example, in policy debate, there are state championships for 6A, 5A, 4A, and 3-2-1A combined.

=== Historical classifications ===
Basketball:

- 2021 to present: 6A, 5A, 4A, 3A, 2A, 1A-Division I, 1A-Division II
- 2019 to 2020: 6A, 5A, 4A, 3A, 2A, 1A
- 2014 to 2018: 6A, 5A, 4A-Division I, 4A-Division II, 3A, 2A, 1A-Division I, 1A-Division II
- 2011 to 2013: 6A, 5A, 4A, 3A, 2A, 1A-Division I, 1A-Division II
- 1969 to 2010: 6A, 5A, 4A, 3A, 2A, 1A
- 1952 to 1968: AA, A, BB, B
- 1941 to 1951: AA, A, B
- 1931 to 1940: A, B

Football:

- 2022 to present: 6A, 5A, 4A, 3A, 2A, 1A, 8-man Division I, 8-man Division II, 6-man
- 2018 to 2021: 6A, 5A, 4A, 3A, 2A, 1A, 8-man Division I, 8-man Division II
- 2014 to 2017: 6A, 5A, 4A-Division I, 4A-Division II, 3A, 2-1A, 8 Man-Division I, 8 Man-Division II
- 1985 to 2013: 6A, 5A, 4A, 3A, 2-1A, 8 Man-Division I, 8 Man-Division II
- 1983 to 1984: 6A, 5A, 4A, 3A, 2A, 1A, 8 Man-Division I, 8 Man-Division II
- 1978 to 1982: 6A, 5A, 4A, 3A, 2A, 1A, 8 Man
- 1969 to 1977: 5A, 4A, 3A, 2A, 1A, 8 Man

== Events ==
The association's largest event is the Kansas State track and field championships, which are held the weekend before Memorial Day at Cessna Stadium on the campus of Wichita State University. The meet, which features athletes from schools in all six classes, is one of the nation's largest high school meet, with more than 3,000 athletes participating. The state track meet hosted its 124th competition in 2024. Current KSHSAA Executive Director Bill Faflick, formerly athletic director for Wichita Public Schools, holds the position of Meet Director and has been widely praised for his direction of the meet.

All state football championship games are held the Saturday after Thanksgiving, ensuring the football season ends before December 1. The games are held at various sites across the state, with current sites including Fort Hays State University in Hays, Pittsburg State University in Pittsburg, and Hutchinson Community College in Hutchinson, as well as high school stadiums in Salina and Topeka. The eight-man championships have been held at Fischer Field in Newton since 2006, while the 6-man championship is at Dodge City.

Kansas is one of the few states, especially in the Midwest, that holds state football championship games at different sites. State championships in Illinois, Indiana, Iowa, Michigan, Minnesota, Nebraska, North Dakota, Ohio, South Dakota, and Wisconsin are held at a single central location. Missouri holds its title games at the same site on two separate weekends.

The state basketball championships are held the second week of March, with girls and boys competition taking place at the same time.

In 2011, the 6A tournament moved to Charles Koch Arena on the campus of Wichita State University, with Emporia taking over the Class 1A-Division I tournament. The 1A-Division II tournament remained at Hays.

Emporia currently hosts the Class 5A tournament, with 6A,. 4A, 3A and 2A remaining at Wichita, Salina, Hutchinson and Manhattan, respectively. The 1A-Division I state tournament is at Dodge City and the 1A-Division II tournament is at Barton Community College in Great Bend.

State championships for baseball and softball are held at the same time as the track championship, usually at community colleges or large recreational fields, although some championships have been held at Lawrence–Dumont Stadium in Wichita, home of the National Baseball Congress tournament and the American Association of Independent Professional Baseball's Wichita Wingnuts, as well as Hoglund Ballpark at KU in Lawrence. The 2011 Class 6A tournament was hosted by KU, and the 5A tournament was hosted by Wichita State at Eck Stadium.

State championships for wrestling are held in late February every year. Up until 2005, classes 6, 5, and 4A held separate but concurrently running tournaments at the Kansas Coliseum in Wichita, Kansas, while 3-2-1A held their tournament at Gross Memorial Coliseum in Hays. After that year, KSHSAA began looking for alternative sites for the classes to hold their tournaments for a number of reasons, including remodeling which was to begin on the Coliseum in the following years.

In 2006, 4A left 5A and 6A and held its own tournament at the Bicentennial Center in Salina, Kansas, while the other classes stayed at their respective sites. In the 2007–08 season, each of the 4 classes competed in 4 separate facilities, as the Coliseum was not available. 3-2-1A and 4A remained in Hays and Salina respectively, while 6A moved to Charles Koch Arena at Wichita State University and 5A moved to Hutchinson High School.

The 2009 6A and 5A championships returned to the Kansas Coliseum, but only for a one-year contract; the Coliseum has since been renovated and no longer hosts athletic events.

The 2010 5A and 6A state wrestling tournaments were held at the Intrust Bank Arena. The 2011 6A and 5A state championships were moved to the Hartman Arena in Park City, Kansas, and have continued there since.

Kansas held its first girls wrestling championships in 2020 at Salina. The next year, girls were split into two divisions, with Classes 5A and 6A at Park City and Classes 1A through 4A at Salina. In 2024, Park City and Salina each hosted one girls tournament and two boys tournaments over three days.

Due to Kansas's cold climate in the winter, the championships for golf, tennis, and soccer are split. Girls compete in golf and tennis in the fall and soccer in the spring, while boys compete in soccer in the fall and golf and tennis in the spring. Boys' golf teams may compete in grass green (traditional) or sand green competition. Girls who attend schools without golf, tennis, and soccer teams are allowed to play on the boys' teams at the school.

== Sanctioned activities ==
KSHSAA classifies its activities into athletic and non-athletic events.

Athletic events

- Baseball
- Bowling
- Basketball
- Cross country
- Football
- Golf
- Girls Gymnastics
- Soccer
- Softball
- Swimming and diving
- Tennis
- Track and field
- Girls Volleyball
- Wrestling

== Criticism ==
KSHSAA has been criticized for its 6A-1A format. Similar sized states, including neighboring Missouri do not have as many classifications, but have more total schools. This over-classification has been deemed a "watered down effect". Many rural schools argue the current classification structure favors schools in larger cities, especially in Classes 5A and 4A, where the discrepancy between the classification numbers is quite large. For the 2008–09 school year, the largest Class 4A school had more than 2.5 times the number of students as the smallest school in the classification.

It has been suggested by many Kansas High School supporters (most specifically in basketball) that 5A and 6A should combine to form one 64 team classification. Other plans call for the 16 biggest 5A schools to jump to 6A. The idea is opposed by schools in the state's three major metropolitan areas (Kansas City, Topeka and Wichita), since the vast majority of 5A and 6A schools are in those areas.

Of the 36 Class 6A schools in 2023-24, 16 were located in Johnson County, the state's most populous county with approximately 21 percent of Kansas's population.

== Leagues ==
There are currently 40 leagues that are accepted by the Kansas State High School Activities Association.

- Approved School (non-KSHAA member schools with approval to play KSHSAA members)
- Ark Valley Chisholm Trail League I
- Ark Valley Chisholm Trail League II
- Ark Valley Chisholm Trail League III
- Ark Valley Chisholm Trail League IV
- Big Seven (merging with Mid-East League to form Big East Conference in 2024-25)
- Centennial
- Central Kansas
- Central Plains
- Central Prairie
- CNC (Cherokee-Neosho-Crawford)
- Eastern Kansas
- Flint Hills
- Frontier
- Great West Activities Conference
- Greater Wichita Athletic League (Wichita City League)
- Heart of America
- Heart of the Plains
- Hi-Plains
- Independent
- Lyon County
- Meadowlark Conference (formerly KCAL)
- Mid-Continent
- Mid-East (merging with Big Seven to form Big East Conference in 2024-25)
- North Central Activities Association
- North Central Kansas
- Northeast Kansas
- Northern Plains
- Northwest Kansas
- Pioneer
- Santa Fe Trail (league has only three members, disqualifying it for a seat on the KSHSAA Board of Directors)
- South Central Border
- Southeast Kansas
- SPAA-Iroquois Activity Assoc.
- Sunflower
- Three Rivers
- Tri-Valley
- Twin Valley
- United Kansas Conference
- Western Athletic Conference
- Western Kansas Liberty
- Wheat State

== See also ==
- NFHS
