= Sand Creek Station Golf Course =

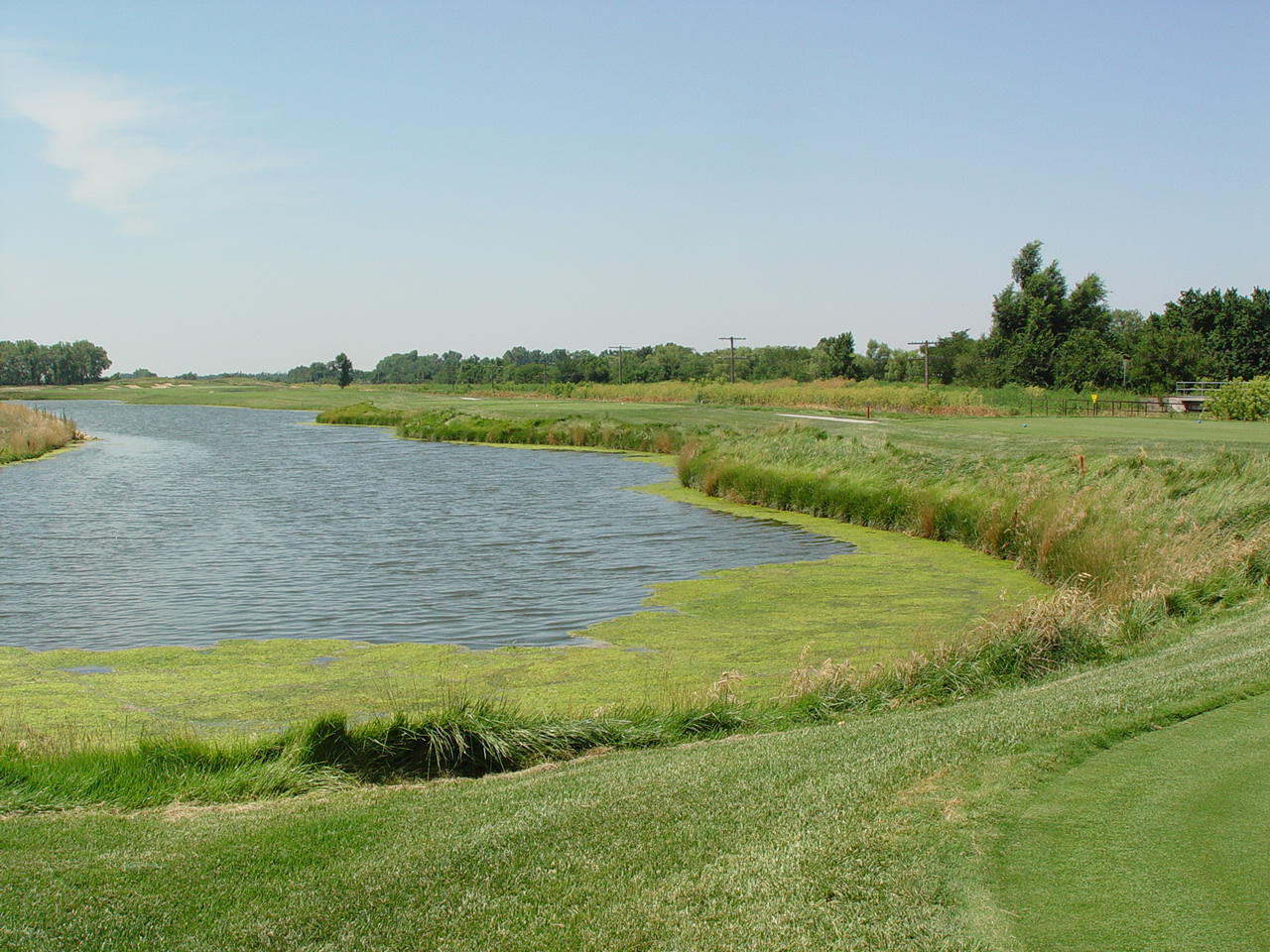
- Interactive map of Sand Creek Station Golf Course
- 38.0196°N 97.3635°W

Club information
- Location: Newton Township, Harvey County, near Newton, Kansas (United States)
- Established: 2006
- Type: Public
- Tota holes: 18
- Tournaments: PGA Nationwide Tour Pro/Am Tournament
- Designed by: Jeff Brauer
- Par: 72
- Length: 7200 yards Longest hole is #10 - 648 yards
- Course rating: 76.3

Sand Creek Station Golf Course just outside Newton, Kansas, is a links-style 18-hole public golf course with a bent grass playing surface designed by architect Jeff Brauer.

Unique features include an active railway running through the course, Sand Creek bordering four holes, and eleven custom ponds. A wooden cart bridge spans Sand Creek, and a concrete underpass allows carts to travel under the Burlington Northern Santa Fe railroad tracks. A biking/walking path runs along the tracks from the course to Southwest 14th Street.

== Overview ==
The par-72 course spans 7,200 yards which sits on the native grass.

The course is one of the most highly acclaimed in Kansas; in 2007 Golfweek Magazine ranked Sand Creek Station as the second-best public course in the state, behind only Colbert Hills in Manhattan, Kansas.

Hole #	Name	Par	Yards
1	Sand Creek	4	474
2	Brauer's Tree	5	613
3	Tabletop	3	178
4	Forever	5	601
5	Railroad	4	345
6	Elevation	4	467
7	Deception	3	229
8	Serenity	4	470
9	Sand Grave	4	373
10	The Beast	5	648
11	Opportunity	4	364
12	Uncertainty	4	420
13	Hidden Trouble	3	230
14	Northward	4	484
15	Buried Elephants	4	382
16	Road Hole	5	525
17	Horseshoe	3	138
18	Stadium	4	426

== Awards and honors ==
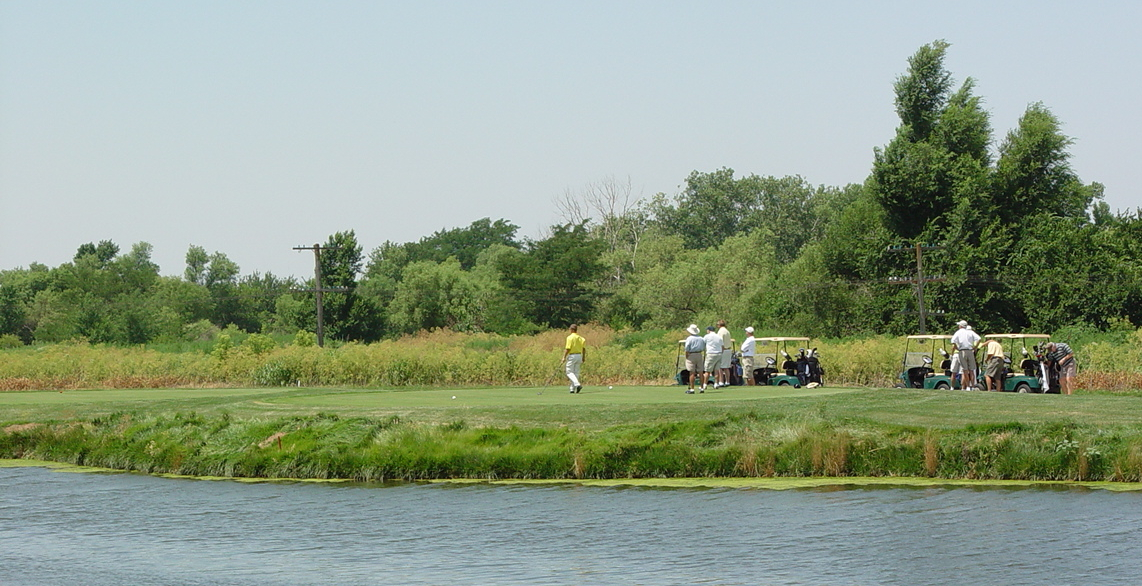
Golfers tee off at #10 at Sand Creek Station Golf Course.

- Golf Digest ranked Sand Creek Station among 2006's best new public courses in America in its January 2008 issue.
- Golfweek Magazine named Sand Creek Station the No. 2 public course in the state of Kansas in March 2007.
- The Kansas chapter of the American Public Works Association named Sand Creek Station a Public Works Project of the Year in 2007.
- The National Golf Foundation honored Sand Creek Station with a Customer Loyalty Award in January 2007.
- GOLF Magazine recognized Sand Creek Station as a Top Ten New Course You Can Play in December 2006.
- Industry magazine Golf Inc. named Sand Creek Station as a finalist for top new public course in the country in November 2006.
- The American Council of Engineering Companies of Kansas awarded Sand Creek Station a City Public Improvement Award in November 2006.
