= Muadianvita Kazadi =

Congolese gridiron football player (born 1973)

TCU Horned Frogs
- Title: Assistant athletics director for football human performance

Personal information
- Born: December 20, 1973 (age 52); Kinshasa, Zaire
- Listed height: 6 ft 2 in (1.88 m)
- Listed weight: 240 lb (109 kg)

Career information
- High school: Newton (Newton, Kansas, U.S.)
- College: Tulsa (1992–1996)
- NFL draft: 1997: 6th round, 179th overall pick

Career history

Playing
- St. Louis Rams (1997); Montreal Alouettes (1999); Kansas City Chiefs (2001); → Barcelona Dragons (2001); Buffalo Bills (2002)*
- * Offseason or practice squad member only

Coaching
- Missouri (c. 2003 – 2004) Graduate assistant; Kansas City Chiefs (2005–2006) Member of staff; USF (2007) Assistant strength coach; Baylor (2008–2016) Strength and conditioning coach; Dallas Cowboys (2017) Member of strength staff; SMU (2018–2021) Strength and conditioning coach

Operations
- Baylor (2012–2016) Associate athletics director for athletic performance; Arkansas State (2017) Assistant athletics director for athletics performance; SMU (2018–2021) Assistant athletics director for human performance; TCU (2022–present) Assistant athletics director for football human performance

Awards and highlights
- Second-team All-Independent (1994)

Career NFL statistics
- Games played: 12
- Stats at Pro Football Reference

Career CFL statistics
- Tackles: 5

Muadianvita Machez "Kaz" Kazadi (born December 20, 1973) is a strength and conditioning coach for the TCU Horned Frogs and a former professional gridiron football player.

Born in Kinshasa (now in the Democratic Republic of the Congo), Kazadi's family moved to the United States when he was age eight, settling in Newton, Kansas, where he played football at Newton High School. He signed to play college football for the Tulsa Golden Hurricane as a linebacker, playing for them from 1992 to 1996 while leading them in tackles in his last three years. He was a Butkus Award semifinalist as a senior when he played the majority of the season with a torn bicep.

Kazadi was selected in the sixth round of the 1997 NFL draft by the St. Louis Rams and made the team in his first year, appearing in 12 games. Released in 1998, he played for the Montreal Alouettes of the Canadian Football League (CFL) in 1999. He then joined the Kansas City Chiefs in 2001 and was allocated to NFL Europe to play for the Barcelona Dragons. He concluded his career with the Buffalo Bills in 2002, being released before the start of the season.

Kazadi started his coaching career with the Missouri Tigers, then worked as an assistant strength and conditioning coach for the Kansas City Chiefs for two years and with the USF Bulls for one year. He was named head strength and conditioning coach for the Baylor Bears in 2008 and remained with the team through 2016. After a brief stint with the Dallas Cowboys, Kazadi worked with the Arkansas State Red Wolves in 2017, for the SMU Mustangs from 2018 to 2021 and with the TCU Horned Frogs since 2022.

== Early life ==
Muadianvita Machez Kazadi was born on December 20, 1973, in Kinshasa (now in the Democratic Republic of the Congo). He has three siblings, two of whom played college basketball. He spent his early years in Kinshasa and played soccer, recalling that "We played that all day." His father, a newspaper reporter, learned of the United States through missionaries and left the family for a year, with a goal of finding a place in the U.S. to move to. He returned and then moved the family to Newton, Kansas, when Kazadi was eight years old.

Kazadi recalled his first years in the U.S.: "It was real rough. You couldn't understand what anybody was talking about. The food was different. Everything. I didn't like the United States at all. It was just so strange." His parents worked washing dishes at a hospital to support the family. While growing up in Newton, Kazadi saw American football games on television and became interested in the sport.

Kazadi started playing intramural American football in sixth grade. He liked playing on defense and continued his football career when attending Newton High School, where he was a linebacker and fullback. At Newton, he was named first-team all-league, first-team all-class and first-team all-state as a senior. Kazadi played for the West team at the Kansas Shrine Bowl all-star game. In addition to playing football at Newton, he also participated in track and field, performing in the shot put, 400m relay and 1,600m. He committed to play college football for the Tulsa Golden Hurricane.

Kazadi also studied martial arts, becoming a purple belt before deciding to solely focus on football. After his football career, he returned to martial arts.

== College career ==
As a freshman at Tulsa in 1992, Kazadi redshirted. He then saw action as a middle linebacker for Tulsa in the 1993 season. In 1994, he totaled 94 tackles, more than anyone else on the team, as the Golden Hurricane compiled a record of 3–8. He was named second-team All-Independent. In the offseason after the 1994 season, Kazadi worked as a prison guard for the Tulsa County Jail, meeting "all sorts of folks, ranging from murderers to child molesters to people who had run stop signs ... big guys, guys with scars in the middle of their faces and just plain scary guys." He said of working at the prison that, "A lot of the guys in our group decided not to come back," but said that that "just made me want to wake up early and go back. It was somewhat exciting." He told the Tulsa World that there were "No big deals. Just regular altercations... They [the prisoners] threw a couple of punches, but they had no chance."

At Tulsa, Kazadi became known as a hard hitter and an "on-field demolition man." He said that his favorite film was Predator with Arnold Schwarzenegger, something he watched "at least 200 times," and described the character Predator as "the perfect linebacker." One of his teammates said that "I think if he could, he would mold his life around that movie." The St. Louis Post-Dispatch said that "Not only does Kazadi like being the Predator at linebacker, he just doesn't nibble at his food once he captures his prey. He tries to devour it." The Tulsa World reported that "Teammates say Kazadi is a nice enough guy off the field, but when kickoff arrives, he turns ruthless." Teammate Brian Newman said that "to [Kazadi] ... it's war whenever he's out there."

Entering the 1995 season, Kazadi was named to the preseason All-Independent team by The Football News. He opened the 1995 season by posting a career high 19 tackles in a game. He finished the season with "just under 100 tackles" to lead the team, being named honorable mention All-Independent as Tulsa ended with a record of 4–7. Kazadi returned to his job as a prison guard in the 1996 offseason. In the second game of his senior year in 1996, he tore a bicep muscle against the Oklahoma State Cowboys. Instead of getting surgery to repair the muscle, which would end his season, Kazadi opted to continue playing, with the Tulsa World dubbing him "Flat-Out Tough". In a win over Oklahoma later in the season, Kazadi was a key player with eight tackles, a tackle-for-loss (TFL), a pass deflection and an interception to set up the winning touchdown, with him afterwards being named the Western Athletic Conference (WAC) Mountain Division defensive player of the week. He ended the season having led the team with 130 tackles – despite only having "one fully functional arm" – and was named second-team All-WAC Mountain Division. He was also a semifinalist for the Butkus Award, given to the best linebacker nationally. Tulsa ended the season with a record of 4–6.

Kazadi graduated from Tulsa with a bachelor's degree in sociology.

== Professional career ==
Following his collegiate career, Kazadi was selected in the sixth round (179th overall) of the 1997 NFL draft by the St. Louis Rams. Head coach Dick Vermeil said that he was the biggest hitter available in the draft and said that "He's a devastating tackler. We know he can hit." He was the first Tulsa linebacker selected in the draft since 1993. By the time of the draft, he had still not had his bicep repaired and said that he "does [not] plan to," saying that he wanted to keep it as a reminder to "just enjoy the moment," although he said that he would get surgery "if they [the Rams] can prove the injury hampers his ability." Following six weeks of practice, the 6 feet 2 inches (1.88 m), 235 pounds (107 kg), Kazadi made the Rams' final roster as a reserve linebacker and special teams player.

Kazadi made his NFL debut in the Rams' season-opening win against the New Orleans Saints on August 31, 1997. He ended up appearing in 12 of the Rams' 16 games in his reserve role, being inactive for four games, as the team compiled an overall record of 5–11. He made approximately $135,000, the league minimum, for his rookie season. He missed time in preseason of 1998 with his biceps injury and was released with an injury settlement on August 25, 1998.

Kazadi was selected in the 1999 NFL Europe draft by the Barcelona Dragons. Instead of playing for the Dragons that year, he moved north and signed with the practice roster of the Montreal Alouettes of the Canadian Football League (CFL) in late September 1999, soon after being added to the active roster due to injuries. In his second career CFL game, against the Saskatchewan Roughriders, he forced a fumble while on special teams. He finished the 1999 CFL season having appeared in four games, recording five special teams tackles while the Alouttes compiled a record of 12–6, before losing to the Hamilton Tiger-Cats in the Eastern Division final by one point. He was among the final cuts for the Alouettes prior to the 2000 season.

Kazadi then returned to the NFL by signing with the Kansas City Chiefs on January 18, 2001. He was sent to the NFL's minor league, NFL Europe, where he appeared in seven games, all as a starter, for the Barcelona Dragons, posting 23 tackles and a forced fumble. He was placed on injured reserve on June 7, 2001, ending his season. The Dragons finished the season with a record of 8–2, reaching World Bowl IX where they lost to the Berlin Thunder. He became an exclusive rights free agent after the season and was not re-signed by the Chiefs.

Kazadi signed with the Buffalo Bills on March 25, 2002, but was later released prior to the season on September 1, 2002. They were the last team of his career. He finished his professional football career having appeared in 12 games in the NFL, four in the CFL (in which he had five tackles) and seven in NFL Europe (in which he made 23 tackles).

== Coaching career ==
After his playing career ended, Kazadi attended the University of Missouri where he received a master's degree in counseling psychology. While at Missouri, he was a graduate assistant with the football team. He became a certified strength and conditioning coach from the College Strength and Conditioning Coaches Association and USA Weightlifting.

Kazadi interned with the strength department of the Kansas City Chiefs in 2005 before becoming a full-time member of the strength and conditioning staff in 2006. After two years with the Chiefs, Kazadi left to serve as an assistant strength coach with the USF Bulls in 2007. He helped the Bulls place as high as No. 2 in the national rankings as they reached the 2007 Sun Bowl. During his time as a Chiefs and Bulls assistant, he met with several top strength coaches – including Super Bowl champion Johnny Parker – to get advice on how to improve. Following a year with USF, Kazadi was hired as the head strength and conditioning coach for the Baylor Bears by incoming head coach Art Briles in December 2007. He also became an assistant athletic director for the Bears.

With the Bears, Kazadi developed a team considered "one of the most conditioned units in the country." He was known for his intense workouts and motivation to the team's players. Running back Glasco Martin said that "In my first couple of years, I was really scared of Coach Kaz. But as I got to know him I know he wants to do things for our best interest. He's tough, but it's tough love and he gets us better." Safety Ahmad Dixon noted that Kazadi changed his approach to best suit players of different experience: "He doesn't care if you were a five-star recruit. But you learn he's not just looking at today. He's looking at how it will help you down the line. When you're no longer a child that needs his hand held, he gives you more freedom."

Kazadi served from 2008 to 2016 with Baylor and was the associate athletics director for athletic performance in his last five years. He developed a number of first round draft picks, including Heisman Trophy-winner Robert Griffin III, as well as second overall draft pick Jason Smith. He helped Baylor set a school record for consecutive years with a bowl game appearance and helped them win consecutive Big 12 Conference championships from 2013 to 2014. Kazadi was a finalist for the FootballScoop.com Strength and Conditioning Coach of the Year award in 2011 and then won the award in 2012. He was named the Strength Coach of the Year by the American Football Coaches Association (AFCA) and the FBS Strength Coach of the Year by American Football Monthly in 2013. Kazadi also received praise for "holding the team together" amid the Baylor University sexual assault scandal, which resulted in head coach Briles being fired in the summer of 2016. He was reassigned to a role outside of the athletic staff in March 2017.

Kazadi briefly worked with the Dallas Cowboys before being hired by the Arkansas State Red Wolves in June 2017. With Arkansas State, he held the title of assistant athletics director for athletics performance, managing athletics performance staff in every sport. In January 2018, he was hired by the SMU Mustangs as assistant athletic director for human performance, as well as being named head strength and conditioning coach for the football team. Later that year, he was awarded the title of master strength and conditioning coach by the Collegiate Strength and Conditioning Coaches Association (CSCCa), the highest honor for the position.

Following four seasons with the Mustangs, Kazadi was hired as assistant athletics director for football human performance by the TCU Horned Frogs for the 2022 season. Wes Harris, an offensive lineman, noted that on "The very first day -- I don't even think we'd gotten back in school yet -- we get a text from Coach Kaz saying, '5:30 a.m. workouts, be here early at 5 o'clock,'" and Kazadi declared "That is the last time you will ever look at me and question what I'm doing" in the first team meeting.

Head coach Sonny Dykes described Kazadi as "a trusted voice who spends more time with the players than anyone," noting:

He is so different than most strength coaches ... I think Kaz is our Minister of Culture. At some point I got to where I completely 100% trusted his instincts. He's trying to get the guys bigger, faster, stronger, like everybody is. But he's got an element of sports psychology in every single workout. He sees every bit of time in the weight room as an opportunity to build the team.

In his first year there, he helped the Horned Frogs to a 12–0 start while they reached the national championship, where they lost to Georgia. ESPN described his role as "crucial in earning the buy-in that first-year coaches need. Players have welcomed the accountability that he demands ... his work has spoken for itself."

== Personal life ==
Kazadi is married and has three children. One son, Ra'sun, played college football for SMU.
