= Newton Township, Kansas =

Township in Kansas, United States

Newton Township Harvey County, Kansas
- Township
- Location within Harvey County

- Location within state of Kansas
- Coordinates: 38°2′35″N 97°19′6″W
- Country: United States
- State: Kansas
- County: Harvey

Area
  - Total: 26.77 sq mi (69.34 km^{2})
  - Land: 26.75 sq mi (69.29 km^{2})
  - Water: 0.019 sq mi (0.05 km^{2}) 0.07%
- Elevation: 1,486 ft (453 m)

Population (2020)
  - Total: 2,207
  - Density: 82.50/sq mi (31.85/km^{2})
- Time zone: UTC-6 (CST)
  - Summer (DST): UTC-5 (CDT)
- FIPS code: 20-50500
- GNIS ID: 473694
- Website: County website

Newton Township is a township in Harvey County, Kansas, United States. As of the 2020 census, its population was 2,207.

== Geography ==
Newton Township covers an area of 26.77 square miles (69.3 km^{2}) and contains two incorporated settlements: Newton (the county seat) and North Newton. According to the USGS, it contains two cemeteries: Greenwood and Saint Marys.

== Transportation ==
Newton Township contains one airport, the Newton City-County Airport is located three miles east of the city of Newton.
