= Warkentin House =

Historic house in Kansas, United States

- U.S. National Register of Historic Places
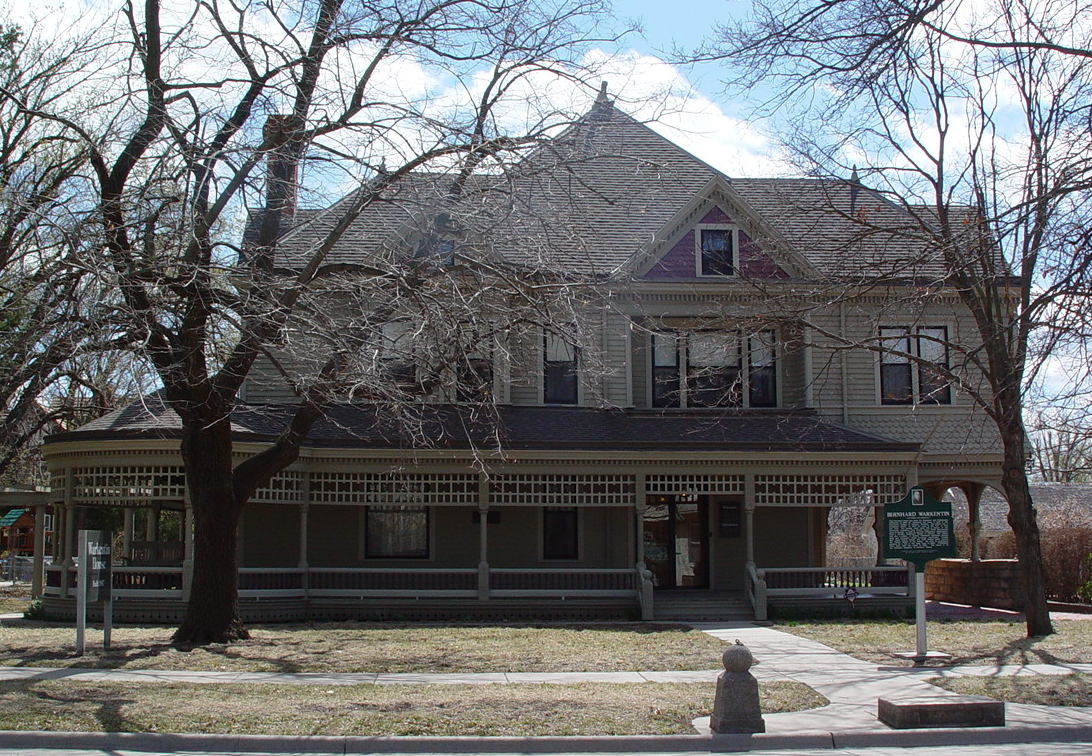
- Warkentin House

- Location within Kansas Location within the United States
- Interactive map showing the location of Warkentin House
- Location: 211 East 1st Street, Newton, Kansas
- Coordinates: 38°2′35.97″N 97°20′23.03″W
- Built: 1886
- Architectural style: Late Victorian
- Website: Website
- NRHP reference No.: 70000250
- Added to NRHP: January 12, 1970

The Warkentin House is a house in Newton, Kansas, United States. The home of Bernhard Warkentin and Wilhelmina Eisenmayer Warkentin, it was built between 1886 and 1887. It is listed on the Kansas Register of Historic Places and National Register of Historic Places as a splendid example of the Victorian period in American architecture and furnishings. The Victorian house offers a glimpse into the way the Warkentins lived, with 80 percent of the original furnishings remaining.

== History ==
Bernhard Warkentin

Wilhelmina Warkentin

Bernhard Warkentin was born in the village of Altonau of the Molotschna Mennonite settlement in Ukraine on June 18, 1847. In 1872, he arrived in the United States to study the country's agricultural, economic and political climate.

Wilhelmina Eisenmayer was born November 1, 1852, in Horse Prairie, Illinois. She and Bernhard were married August 12, 1875. They had two children: Edna Wella, born September 24, 1876, and Carl Orlando, born January 3, 1880.

Realizing the benefit the Mennonite farmers would be to the development of the Great Plains states, American railroad companies touted the advantages of settling in the midwestern United States. Between 1874 and 1884, about 15,000 Mennonites immigrated to America. The majority settled in Kansas. Bernhard Warkentin encouraged the immigrants to bring with them Turkey Red hard winter wheat.

In 1873, Warkentin settled in Halstead, Kansas, building Harvey County's first grist mill and his farmstead on the Little Arkansas River. In planning for his mill, Warkentin visited several milling operations throughout the Midwest; among them was Conrad Eisenmayer's mill in Summerfield, Illinois. It was there that he met Eisenmayer's daughter, Wilhelmina.

In the fall of 1874, the Kansas countryside was first sown with Turkey Red wheat, the hardy, high-yield variety that gave Kansas its enormous productivity and made the region the breadbasket of the world.

Warkentin owned mills and elevators in Newton and Halstead, Kansas, and Blackwell, Oklahoma. He was instrumental in founding the Halstead State Bank, Kansas State Bank, Bethel Deaconess Hospital, and Bethel College.

Warkentin died by accidental gunshot on a trip in the Holy Land in 1908. Wilhelmina Warkentin lived in their Newton home until her death in 1932.

Following her death, Wilhelmina left the house to the Bethel Deaconesses, who used it until 1970. At this time, ownership was transferred to a group dedicated to restoring and maintaining the house, which was also added to the National Register of Historic Places. The city assumed ownership in 1973, and continues to operate the museum and maintain the house.

== Interior ==
=== Foyer ===
- The main entrance door displays a cut and etched glass panel imported from France.
- English carpenters crafted the fine woodwork evident in the main staircase and the ball-and-spindle fretwork in the foyer.
- The lavatory near the front door allowed dusty travelers to freshen up using an English cabinet with teardrop pulls and Italian marble washbasin. The lion-head towel holder is English.
- Many small details exhibit the fine workmanship of the carpenters, and the leatherette wainscoting in the main foyer, lavatory, and stairwell is especially luxurious.

=== Parlor and music room ===
- The fireplace in the parlor has a cherry mantelpiece and Italian tiles.
- The rosewood/mahogany empire loveseat exhibits Chinese influence in carved dog's heads and claw feet.
- The box sofa was made in England, and the cornice molding around the ceiling repeats the "gadrooning" (radiating lobes) design of the sofa.
- The woodwork in the other rooms continues the same themes begun in the foyer, but the woodwork in the parlor is cherry-finished walnut. The music room returns to oak woodwork, and the dining room is walnut. The sliding (pocket) doors between the music room and dining room were crafted of two woods, each side matching the appropriate room.
- The music room and parlor have crystal chandeliers from Czechoslovakia.
- The Steinway upright piano belonged to the Warkentins' daughter, Edna, and the floor in the music room is covered by one of many Anglo-Persian carpets in the house.
- The music room is spacious and well-lighted by windows on the east and south.

=== Dining room and kitchen ===
- The Italian tile in the dining room fireplace portrays the goddess of agriculture, Demeter in Greek mythology or Ceres in the Roman pantheon.
- The Warkentins entertained elegantly, and the china closet contains some of their original serving pieces; including a chocolate pot.
- The jeweled and stained glass windows on either side of the fireplace pre-date the house and are believed to be of Russian origin.
- The large medallion in the wall covering echoes the emblem in the satin glass globes of the bronze chandelier and the wall sconces.
- Nineteenth-century luxury did not extend to the kitchen. Electricity replaced gas for lighting soon after the completion of the house, but the old wood/coal cookstove continued in use for many years.
- Indoor plumbing was installed two years after the completion of the house. A servant pumped water into a large, copper-lined reservoir in the third-floor attic at the beginning of each day. The three sinks in the kitchen are slate.

=== Bedrooms ===
- The two-room master suite has a sitting room to the southwest. The birdseye maple suite is original to the house, but it was not located in the master bedroom.
- The brass double bed is now in the northwest bedroom and also belonged to the Warkentins. Much of the furniture in the bedrooms is not original to the house. The trunk at the foot of the bed was used by the Warkentins in their travels.
- The parquet flooring throughout the house consists of several different woods and is finely crafted. The most unusual floor covering is in the master suite, where bright red Russian rugs, originally in the music room, have been moved for preservation. Warkentin himself purchased them in Russia, and the thistle pattern displays the Russian national flower.

=== Library ===
- The most unusual fireplace is in the library. The tile is again Italian, but the hearth displays a most unusual diagonal band.
- Bernhard Warkentin's roll-top desk is no longer on the east wall of the library, but his wife's oak writing desk stands in that location. His favorite chair has striking lion's heads on the arms and claw feet. The design on the coal scuttle is similar to that on the etched glass of the front door. The walnut library case is one of the few furnishings native to Kansas. It was constructed in Leavenworth and contains family books.
