= Dallas Wiebe =

American poet

Dallas Wiebe (1930–2008) was an American writer, poet, and a professor of English. He is best known for his 1969 controversial novel, Skyblue the Badass. The Newton, Kansas native was also a founder of the writing program at the University of Cincinnati, where he served as professor in the Department of English from 1963 until 1995. Some of his other works include "Night Flight to Stockholm," The Transparent Eyeball, Down the River: A Collection of Ohio Valley Fiction and Poetry, "Skyblue on the Dump", "Skyblue's Memoirs," Our Asian Journey, Going to the Mountain, The Kansas Poems and The Vox Populi Stories.

== Early life and education ==
Wiebe was born in Newton, Kansas. He completed his undergraduate education at Bethel College. He attended graduate school at the University of Michigan, where he co-founded the "John Barton Wolgamot Society".

== Career ==
Wiebe's career as a professor began at the University of Wisconsin in 1960. He left the University of Wisconsin in 1963 and went to the University of Cincinnati as an assistant professor of English. Wiebe wrote Skyblue the Badass between 1963 and 1967, and it was published in 1969.

In 1968, Wiebe initiated creative writing courses at the University of Cincinnati, which paved the way for the creation of the university's Creative Writing Program in 1976. Wiebe taught in the program from its inception until 1993 and served as director for eight years. In addition, Wiebe served as literary adviser for the university's literary magazine, PROFILE.

Wiebe co-founded the Cincinnati Poetry Review in 1975 and served as its editor. He also co-founded the Cincinnati Writer's Project (CWP) in 1987.

He continued to write and publish works throughout his life. He retired from university work in 1995.

== Skyblue on the Dump censorship issue ==
In 1967, New Yorker Carl Gorton happened to read Wiebe's short story, "Skyblue on the Dump" in Farmington Public Library's copy of The Paris Review #39. Disturbed by the content of the story, Gorton removed the magazine from the library, which was against library policy. The removal was reported in The New York Times, where Gorton was quoted as stating that the story "'should not be available to minors" or made available "at the expenditure of taxpayers' dollars."'

Gorton was later elected to the Farmingdale library board, where he printed and distributed a scene from the story to support his views about the library budget. The editor of The Paris Review, George Plimpton, denounced the censoring of the magazine in the June 1967 New York Newsday article titled "Literary Lion Roars Back." Students from the State University of New York-Farmingdale publicly protested the censorship outside of the South Farmingdale library branch.

== Works ==
Wiebe's works, in order by date of publication

- "Sonnet," published in The Paris Review, 1963
- In the Late Gnat Night, 1965
- "Skyblue on the Dump," published in The Paris Review, 1966
- Skyblue the Badass, 1969
- "Night Flight to Stockholm," published in The Paris Review, 1978, and included in the 2912 anthology Object Lessons.
- The Transparent Eyeball: Stories, 1982
- The Transparent Eyeball, 1984
- The Kansas Poems, 1987
- Going to the Mountain, 1988
- Skyblue's Essays, 1995
- Our Asian Journey, 1997
- Skyblue's Memoirs, finished in 1972, excerpts published in 2003
- The Vox Populi Stories, 2003
- The Saying of Abraham Nofziger: A Guide for the Perplexed, 2004
- The Notebook of Laura Bonair: and other stories, 2005
- Fer Fio's Journey, 2005
- The Nofziger Letters, 2005
- On the Cross: Devotional Poems, 2005
- The Nofziger Letters II, 2006
- The White Book of Life, 2006
- The Sayings of Abraham Nofziger II: An Enchiridion for the Pious, 2007
- Monument: On Aging and Dying, 2008

Edited: Down the River: A Collection of Ohio Valley Fiction and Poetry, 1991

Unpublished: Slapsticks (a portion of this work was published in 1999)

== Awards ==
- The Agha Khan Fiction Award, for his short story "Night Flight to Stockhold" published in The Paris Review
- 1998 Governor's Award for Individual Artist
- Individual Artists Grant from the Ohio Arts Council, for a portion of his unpublished work Slapsticks
- Pushcart Prize
