= Newton High School (Kansas) =

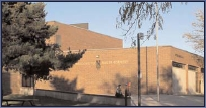

Location
- 900 West 12th Street; Newton, Kansas 67114; United States; 38.059588°N 97.364108°W

Information
- School type: Public, High School
- Established: 1885
- School district: Newton USD 373
- CEEB code: 172175
- Principal: Chad Nulik
- Teaching staff: 69.50 (FTE)
- Grades: 9–12
- Gender: coed
- Enrollment: 982 (2023–2024)
- Student to teacher ratio: 14.13
- Campus type: Suburban
- Colors: Black; Gold
- Athletics: Class 5A, District 5
- Athletics conference: Ark Valley Chisholm Trail League
- Sports: Football, Basketball, Swimming, Bowling, Wrestling, Tennis, Softball, Baseball, Volleyball, Track and field, Cross Country
- Mascot: The Railerman
- Rival: Hutchinson High School
- Newspaper: Newtonian
- Yearbook: Railroader
- Communities served: Newton, Walton, North Newton
- Website: nhs.usd373.org

Newton High School is a public high school in Newton, Kansas, United States operated by Newton USD 373 school district, and serves students of grades 9 to 12. It is located on a 90-acre (360,000 m^{2}) campus with a Cedar-tree surrounded parking lot.

== History ==
Newton High School was founded in 1885. Historically, Newton High School has been located at three different locations:

- first school was located at the northwest corner of 6th and Ash (currently Lincoln Park Apartments) and built in TBD,
- second school was located at the northeast corner of Broadway and Poplar (currently Santa Fe 5/6 Center school) and built in 1914,
- third (current) school is located at the northeast corner of 12th and Boyd (in northwest Newton) and built in the early 1970s. In October 1971, Newton voters approved a $4.9 Million school bond to build a new high school complex and remodel the old high school for use as a middle school.

As a result of a bond election that took place in 2007, renovation construction began on the school in 2009 and was completed in 2010. The renovation added several sections to the school and redistributed the rooms within the building; in this redistribution, safety and modernization were both heavy concerns. Aside from significantly changing the exterior of the school, the renovations also pushed the administration offices forward and relocated the school library.

== Extracurricular activities ==
=== Athletics ===
Students from grades 9–12 participate in football, volleyball, cross country, tennis, girls and boys basketball, wrestling, gymnastics, bowling, swimming, girls and boys soccer, baseball, softball, boys and girls golf, track and field and bowling. Activities available include cheerleading, Railiners Dance Team, Azteca Dancers, debate, forensics, FFA, GSA, KFC, BPA, Drama, Music (Vocal, Band, Jazz Band, Pep Band, Orchestra), Science Olympiad, Model UN, and FIRST Robotics Competition Team.

=== State championships ===
State Championships
Season	Sport	Number of Championships	Year
Fall	Gymnastics, Girls	2	1976, 2009
Fall	Softball	1	1985
Winter	Basketball, Boys	13	1916, 1917, 1921, 1926, 1931, 1936, 1937, 1942, 1946, 1949, 1952, 1956, 1979
Winter	Basketball, Girls	1	2006
Winter	Debate, Girls	8	1931, 1933, 1937, 1938, 1943, 1945, 1949, 2013 (2-speaker)
Winter	Wrestling	4	1963, 1973, 1974, 1977
Spring	Baseball	1	1970
Spring	Tennis, Boys	1	1970
Spring	Track & Field, Boys	1	2009
Spring	Track & Field, Girls	3	2016, 2017, 2018
Spring	Golf, Boys	2	1972, 1975
Total		37	

Updated Summer 2024

== Notable people ==
Faculty

- Mike Moore, former head football coach at Bethel College, assistant head coach and defensive coordinator at Newton High School

Alumni

- Frosty Cox (1908–1962), college basketball coach at the University of Colorado Boulder and the University of Montana
- Reed Crandall (1917–1982), illustrator and penciller of comic books and magazines, inducted into Will Eisner Comic Book Hall of Fame in 2009
- Wyatt Hendrickson (born 2001), wrestler
- Jayne Hrdlicka (born c. 1963), business executive; President and Chair of Tennis Australia and CEO of Virgin Australia Holdings
- Miles Johns (born 1994), mixed martial artist currently competing in the UFC bantamweight division
- Muadianvita Kazadi (born 1973), former linebacker for St. Louis Rams in 1997 and Montreal Alouettes in 1999
- Dustin Richardson (born 1984), former MLB player (Boston Red Sox)

Attended

- Errett Bishop (1928–1983), mathematician, college professor
- Orville Harrold (1877–1933), operatic tenor and musical theatre actor

== See also ==
- Fischer Field Stadium
- List of high schools in Kansas
- List of unified school districts in Kansas
