= Dustin Richardson =

American baseball player (born 1984)

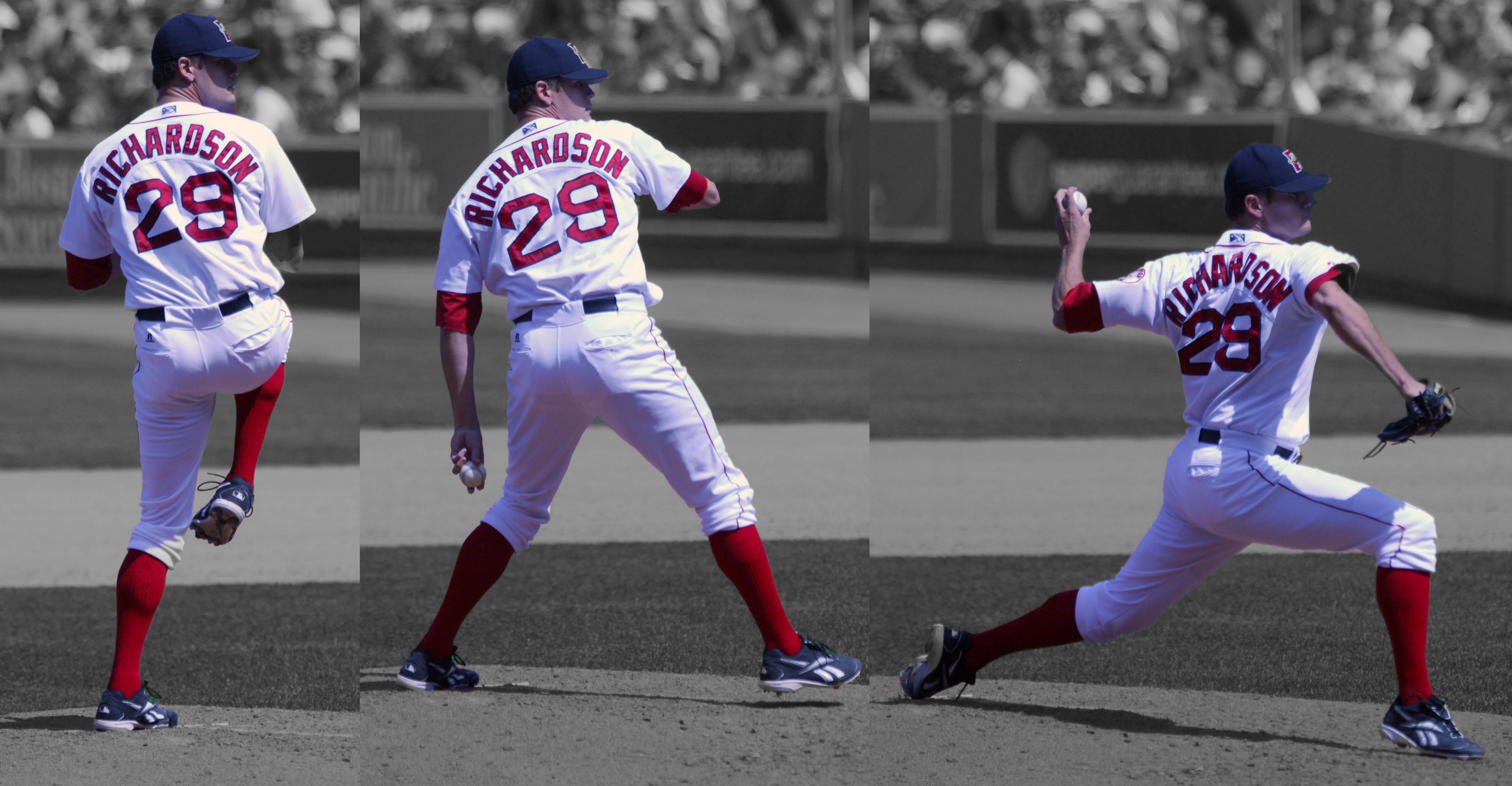
- Richardson in 2009

Guelph Royals – No. 41
- Pitcher
- Born: January 9, 1984 (age 42); Newton, Kansas, U.S.
- Bats: Left Throws: Left

MLB debut
- September 28, 2009, for the Boston Red Sox

MLB statistics (through 2010 season)
- Win–loss record: 0–0
- Earned run average: 3.31
- Strikeouts: 12
- Stats at Baseball Reference

Teams
- Boston Red Sox (2009–2010)

Dustin A. Richardson (born January 9, 1984) is an American professional baseball pitcher for the Guelph Royals of the Canadian Baseball League (CBL). He has previously played in Major League Baseball (MLB) for the Boston Red Sox.

== Career ==
=== Amateur career ===
Richardson attended Newton High School in Newton, Kansas, and then went to Cowley County Community College and Texas Tech University.

=== Boston Red Sox ===
Richardson was drafted in the fifth round, with the 163rd overall selection, of the 2006 Major League Baseball draft by the Boston Red Sox. He made his professional debut for the Low-A Lowell Spinners that year. Richardson spent the majority of the 2008 season on the roster of the Double-A Portland Sea Dogs of the Eastern League, and was invited to his first Major League spring training in 2009.

Richardson made his MLB debut with 1 1/3 innings of scoreless relief against the Toronto Blue Jays on September 28, 2009. He pitched in three games total games during his rookie campaign in 2009. Richardson made 26 appearances for Boston during the 2010 season, recording a 4.15 ERA with 12 strikeouts across 13 innings of work.

=== Florida Marlins ===
On November 12, 2010, Richardson was traded to the Florida Marlins in exchange for Andrew Miller. He appeared in 23 games for the Triple–A New Orleans Zephyrs, logging a 3-1 record and 3.66 ERA with 35 strikeouts. Richardson was designated for assignment by the Marlins on June 17, 2011.

=== Atlanta Braves ===
On June 22, 2011, Richardson was claimed off waivers by the Atlanta Braves. He was subsequently assigned to the Triple-A Gwinnett Braves, where he had a 6.00 ERA with 29 strikeouts in 23 games. On September 1, Richardson was removed from the 40-man roster and sent outright to Triple-A Gwinnett. He was released by the Braves organization on December 16.

On January 25, 2012, Major League Baseball announced that, effective upon his signing by a major league team, Richardson would be suspended for 50 games for violating MLB's drug policy, having tested positive for amphetamine, Letrozole, Methandienone, Metenolone, and Trenbolone.

=== Sugar Land Skeeters ===
On June 8, 2012, Richardson signed with the Sugar Land Skeeters of the Atlantic League of Professional Baseball. In 17 games (2 starts) for the Skeeters, he recorded a 3.77 ERA with 31 strikeouts across 31 innings of work.

On March 15, 2013, Richardson re-signed with the Skeeters. In six games (one start) for Sugar Land, he posted a 1.04 ERA with five strikeouts across 8 2/3 innings pitched.

=== Los Angeles Angels of Anaheim ===
On June 15, 2013, Richardson signed a minor league contract with the Los Angeles Angels of Anaheim. He was assigned to the Triple-A Salt Lake Bees, and struggled to a 6.47 ERA with 50 strikeouts over 20 games. Richardson elected free agency on November 4.

On May 4, 2014, Richardson re-signed with the Angels organization on a minor league contract. He returned to Salt Lake, and posted a 7.69 ERA with 56 strikeouts in 36 games.

=== Los Angeles Dodgers ===
On February 18, 2015, Richardson signed a minor league contract with the Los Angeles Dodgers. He pitched in 14 games in 2015 (with four starts) combined for the Double–A Tulsa Drillers and Triple–A Oklahoma City Dodgers and was 2–0 with a 2.08 ERA and 25 strikeouts. He elected free agency on November 6.

On November 10, 2015, Richardson re-signed with the Dodgers on a new minor league contract. In 8 games split between Tulsa and Oklahoma City, he struggled to a 6.48 ERA with 12 strikeouts across 8 1/3 innings pitched. Richardson was released by the Dodgers organization on May 10, 2016.

=== Long Island Ducks ===
On June 15, 2016, Richardson signed with the Long Island Ducks of the Atlantic League of Professional Baseball. In 13 games (4 starts) for Long Island, he registered a 1-3 record and 3.51 ERA with 24 strikeouts over 25 2/3 innings of work.

=== Sugar Land Skeeters (second stint) ===
On April 13, 2017, Richardson signed with the Sugar Land Skeeters of the Atlantic League of Professional Baseball. In 48 appearances for the Skeeters, he compiled a 1-4 record and 5.02 ERA with 62 strikeouts and 4 saves across 43 innings pitched. Richardson was released by Sugar Land on September 4.

=== Long Island Ducks (second stint) ===
On September 8, 2017, Richardson signed with the Long Island Ducks of the Atlantic League of Professional Baseball. In 6 appearances for the Ducks, he posted a 1-0 record and 4.15 ERA with 8 strikeouts across 4 1/3 innings pitched. Richardson became a free agent after the season.

=== York Revolution ===
On August 20, 2018, Richardson signed with the York Revolution of the Atlantic League of Professional Baseball. In 13 appearances for York, he recorded a 2.87 ERA with 27 strikeouts and four saves across 15 2/3 innings of relief.

Richardson re-signed with the team for the 2019 season. In two starts for the Revolution, he posted an 0-1 record and 4.50 ERA with nine strikeouts over eight innings of work. Richardson became a free agent following the season.

=== Toronto Maple Leafs ===
On July 4, 2023, Richardson signed with the Toronto Maple Leafs of the Intercounty Baseball League (IBL). In seven appearances for the club, he struggled to a 7.83 ERA with 20 strikeouts across 10 1/3 innings of work.

On April 21, 2024, Richardson re–signed with the Maple Leafs. He made eight scoreless appearances for Toronto, striking out 14 batters with two saves across 7 2/3 innings pitched.

On February 7, 2025, Richardson again re-signed with the Maple Leafs.

=== Guelph Royals ===
On March 17, 2026, Richardson and Luca Boscarino were traded to the Guelph Royals in exchange for shortstop Brando Leroux and cash considerations.

== Personal ==
As part of the television show Knight School, Richardson tried out for the Texas Tech Red Raiders men's basketball team.
