= Newton City/County Airport =

Newton City-County Airport
- IATA: EWK; ICAO: KEWK; FAA LID: EWK

Summary
- Airport type: Public
- Owner: City of Newton & Harvey County
- Serves: Harvey County, Kansas
- Location: Newton, Kansas
- Elevation AMSL: 1,533 ft / 467 m
- Coordinates: 38°03′30″N 097°16′28″W
- Website: www.NewtonAirport.com

Map
- Location of airport in Kansas / United States EWK (the United States)

Runways
Direction	Length		Surface
Direction	ft	m	Surface
17/35	7,003	2,135	Asphalt
8/26	3,501	1,067	Asphalt

Statistics (2019)
- Aircraft operations (year ending 8/21/2019): 65,044
- Based aircraft: 85
- Source: Federal Aviation Administration

Newton City-County Airport (IATA: EWK, ICAO: KEWK, FAA LID: EWK) is three miles east of Newton, in Harvey County, Kansas. It is owned by the City of Newton and Harvey County.

== History ==
This establishment was created during World War 2 as a flight training facility for the U.S. Navy. After WW2 ended, it was converted into an airport. It is mostly used as a transport facility now. Also, the FAA's National Plan of Integrated Airport Systems for 2011–2015 categorized it as a reliever airport for Wichita Mid-Continent Airport.

== Facilities ==
The airport covers 635 acres (257 ha) at an elevation of 1,533 feet (467 m). It has two asphalt runways: runway 17/35 is 7,003 by 100 feet (2,135 x 30 m) and 8/26 is 3,501 by 60 feet (1,067 x 18 m).

The Hesston College aviation program operates out of Hangar K.

In the year ending August 21, 2019, the airport had 65,044 aircraft operations, average 178 per day: 98% general aviation, 1% air taxi, and <1% military. 85 aircraft were then based at the airport: 78 single-engine, 4 multi-engine, 2 jet, and 1 helicopter.

== See also ==
- List of airports in Kansas
