= Bernhard Warkentin Homestead =

Historic house in Kansas, United States

- U.S. National Register of Historic Places
- U.S. National Historic Landmark
- Location within Kansas Location within the United States
- Location: E. North St., Halstead, Kansas
- Coordinates: 38°0′24″N 97°30′16″W
- Area: 12 acres (4.9 ha)
- Built: 1874
- Architect: Haskell, John Gideon
- Architectural style: Queen Anne
- NRHP reference No.: 74000839

Significant dates
- Added to NRHP: February 15, 1974
- Designated NHL: December 14, 1990

The Bernhard Warkentin Homestead, also known as Little River Stock Farm or Warkentin Farm, is a historic farm complex on East North Street in Halstead, Kansas. It was listed on the National Register of Historic Places in 1974. It was further declared to be a National Historic Landmark in 1990, nationally significant for its association with Bernhard Warkentin, a pivotal figure in the development and wide cultivation of durum wheat in the country.

== Description and history ==
The Warkentin Farm is located on the northern fringe of Halsted, on the east side of Main Street at East North Street. The property consists of 12 acres (4.9 ha), bound on the south by railroad tracks, the north and east by the Arkansas River, and the west by a grain elevator. The farm complex is clustered near the western end of the property, with fields to the east. Buildings in the farmstead include the house, carriage house, barn, a silo, and a small pump house. The house is a 2 1/2-story wood-frame structure, built in 1884 to a design by Kansas architect John G. Haskell.

Bernhard Warkentin was a well-to-do Russian immigrant of German extraction, who immigrated to the United States from Russia in 1872. In Russia he had been involved in the family business, the raising and milling of wheat. A de facto leader of a Mennonite emigration and colonization effort, Warkentin purchased over 1,300 acres (530 ha), and established is home and mill here in 1874, while working to assist other German Mennonites in their drive to leave Russia. One of the major improvements in agriculture that Warkentin and the Mennonites brought with them were knowledge of Russian hard wheat varieties, which they brought over in the early years of the colonization. In 1896, Warkentin began working with Mark Carleton of the United States Department of Agriculture to improve American knowledge of Russian wheat varieties, which eventually resulted in the hybridization experiments that produced durum wheat, one of the nation's leading wheat crops.

== See also ==
- List of National Historic Landmarks in Kansas
- National Register of Historic Places listings in Harvey County, Kansas
