= Carnegie Library (Newton, Kansas) =

- U.S. National Register of Historic Places
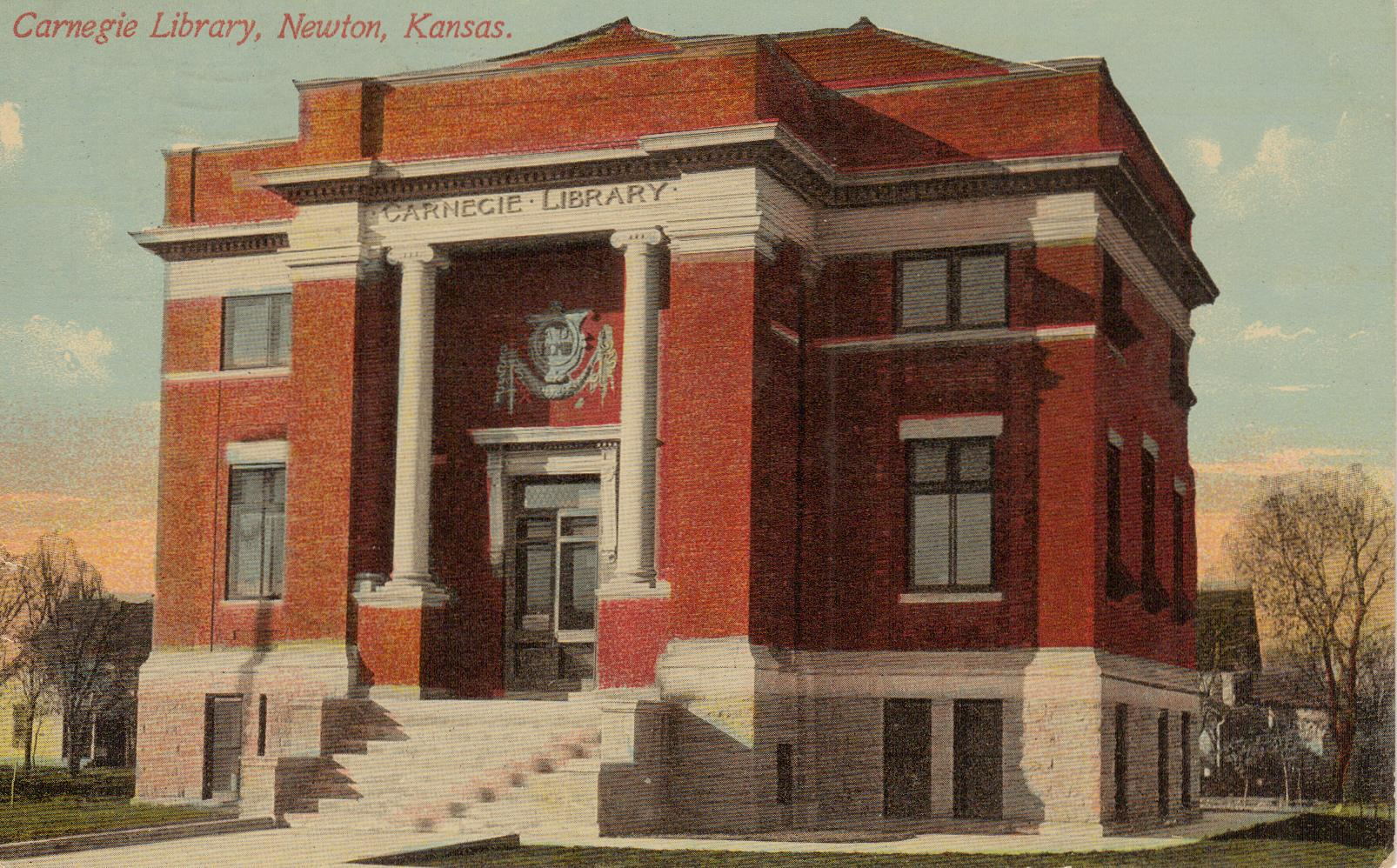
- Postcard image of the Carnegie Library

- Location within Kansas Location within the United States
- Location: 203 Main St, Newton, Kansas
- Coordinates: 38°2′39″N 97°20′42″W
- Area: 1 acre (0.40 ha)
- Built: 1903
- Architect: Rose, W. W.; Reikowsky & Co.
- NRHP reference No.: 74000840
- Added to NRHP: May 31, 1974

The Carnegie Library in Newton, Kansas is a building from 1903. It was listed on the National Register of Historic Places in 1974.

It was built as a two-story 51 by 62 feet (16 m × 19 m) building; a 30 feet (9.1 m) one-story addition was added later.

== Harvey County Historical Museum ==
The Harvey County Historical Museum is now located in the former library. Opened in 1974, the museum features exhibits about the county's history and culture, offers public programs and speakers, operates the 1873 Kellas School, and houses an archive of historic photos and documents.
