= Fischer Field Stadium =

- U.S. National Register of Historic Places
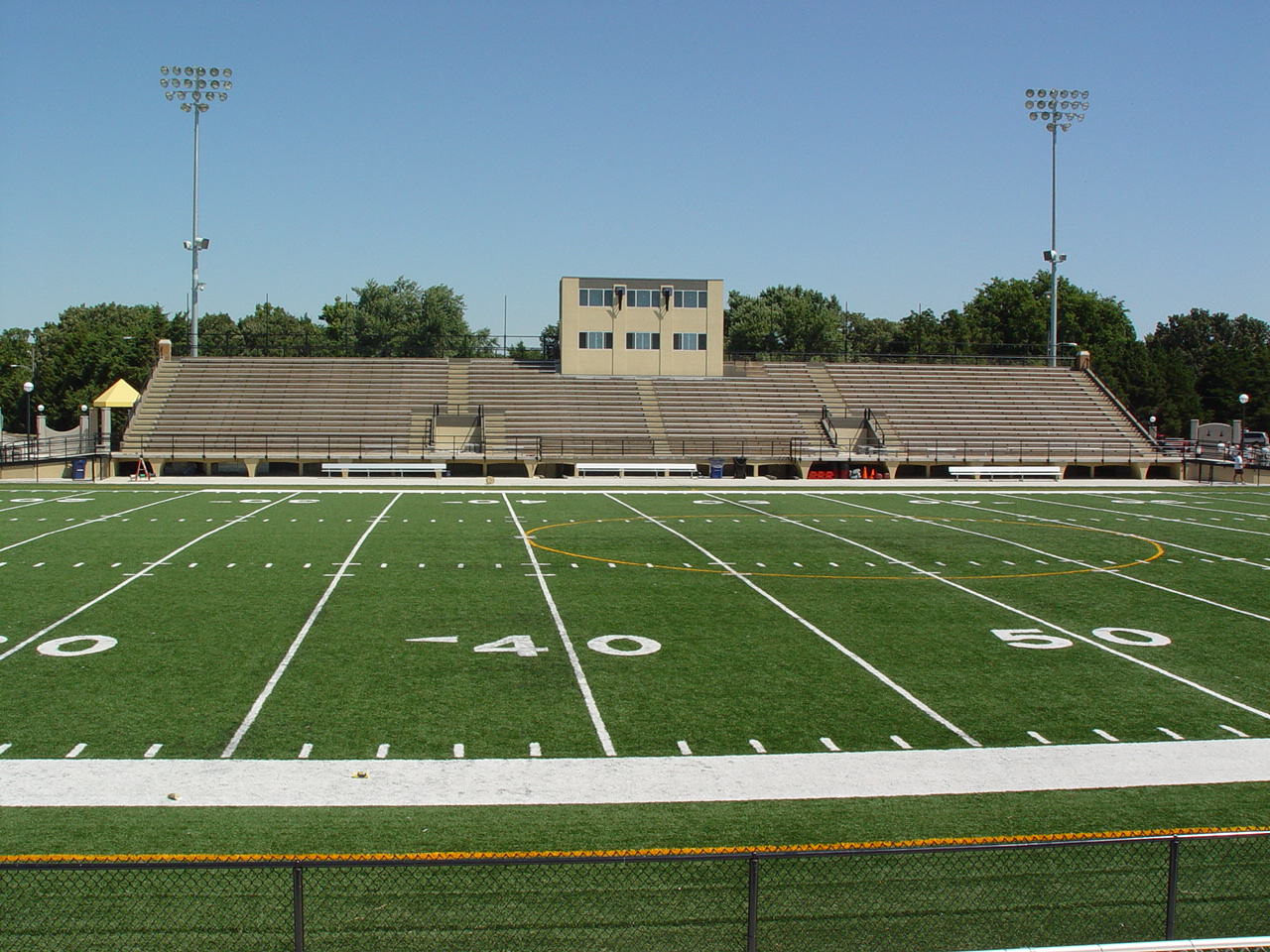
- Fischer Field Stadium
- Location: Newton, KS
- Coordinates: 38°2′40.77″N 97°21′23.23″W
- Built: 1936
- Architect: Knowland Brode
- MPS: New Deal-Era Resources of Kansas MPS
- NRHP reference No.: 03001394
- Added to NRHP: January 14, 2004

Fischer Field Stadium is the signature athletic field in Newton, Kansas, and is located in Athletic Park. The stadium is used for athletic events — including high school football and soccer (including the state's 8-man football championship), competitive leagues, and semi-pro football — concerts, Newton High School graduation and a variety of community events and festivals. The stadium is listed on both the Kansas Register and National Register of Historic Places. It can seat up to 5,000 people.

== Fischer Field history ==
Dr. John T. Axtell, owner of the land upon which Athletic Park sits, came to Newton in 1878. He served as the principal of one of the city schools for two years, saving money to enter the University of Michigan Medical School. After the two-year course there and studies at Bellevue Hospital Medical College in New York City, he was awarded the degree of Doctor of Medicine in 1883. In 1887, Dr. Axtell established the first hospital in Newton. His wife, Lucena Chase Axtell, with two young daughters in tow, then attended the College of Physicians and Surgeons in Kansas City. She graduated in 1895, becoming one of the first female physicians in the nation. Dr. Lucena Axtell and Dr. J.L. Abbey joined Dr. Axtell in medical practice at the Axtell Hospital, eventually establishing the Axtell Clinic.

As well as contributing greatly to medicine in the state, Dr. John Axtell was an entrepreneur interested in livestock, horses, and horse racing. Dr. Axtell's Newton Driving and Athletic Association built what became known as "one of the fastest half-mile race tracks in the state" upon land he owned. In 1909, Dr. Axtell sold the land to the City of Newton for $5,000, financed though a 10-year bond issue. This purchase included most of the land that is now Athletic Park. Since 1909, Athletic Park has served many functions, including hosting an automobile tourist camp in the early days of automobile travel, quoted in a Chamber of Commerce pamphlet in the mid-1920s to be "one of the most comfortable and commodious tourist camps in Kansas." The race track in the park was used for horse, motorcycle, and automobile racing; the park also contained ball fields, playgrounds, and picnic shelters. A zoo with several animals and a working small-scale railroad entertained a generation of children in the 1960s. Newtonians swam in Sand Creek at Athletic Park until the public swimming pool was built in the park in 1934.

In 1935, the City of Newton was granted funds by the Works Progress Administration, a New Deal program for recovery from the Great Depression, to build a football stadium in Athletic Park. The stadium was completed in 1936. More than 1,400 athletic fields and 1,800 swimming pools were constructed with New Deal funds, but stadiums were rare. Fischer Field is a significant historic structure in Newton because of its ties to the New Deal programs and the rarity of a stadium funded by those programs. It is one of the few remaining remnants of the city's development in the 1930s.

The stadium has been the home of Newton High School football and until 2005, the home of Bethel College football, as well as community events. The stadium, named Curtis Fischer Field in 1992, was placed on the Kansas Register of Historic Places in August 2003 and on the National Register of Historic Places in December 2003. Another structure in the park listed on the state and national registers is the Mennonite Settler statue, sculpted in 1942 by artist Max Nixon.

== Rehabilitation ==
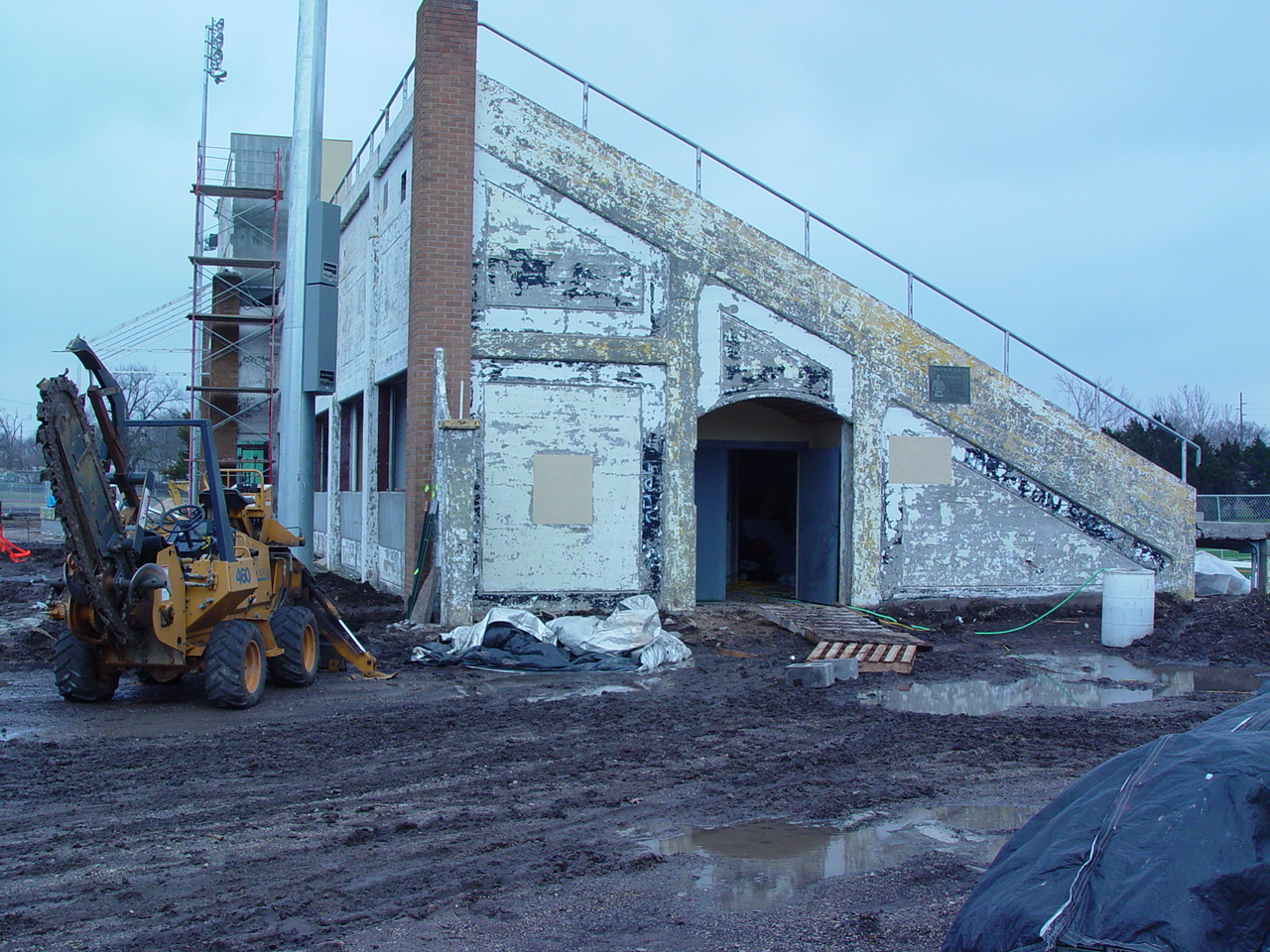
Fischer Field Stadium during renovations in 2005

In 2004, the City of Newton, Newton Recreation Commission and Newton USD 373 committed a total of 1.8 mills of property taxes to upgrade athletic facilities citywide. This included the renovation, rehabilitation and additions to Fischer Field Stadium. Funding for the stadium project also came from a Heritage Trust Fund Grant from the Kansas State Historical Society and private contributions.

The Fischer Field Stadium project included construction of a one-story masonry and concrete structure that houses public restrooms and concession sales, two public plazas at either end of the existing stadium, new visitor bleachers, and concrete walkways and pad; and renovations and historic preservation work on the existing stadium, including new locker rooms, full ADA upgrades, restrooms, mechanical systems, electrical systems and bleachers. Two paved parking lots were constructed, and new low-level lighting was also added. The project also included removal of the natural turf and installation of state-of-the-art artificial turf by FieldTurf, new goal posts, and new field lighting and sound system.

A private fundraising campaign, "Fields of Memories," raised about $125,000 for the project from Newton High School alumni and supporters. In August 2005, the Newton Kansan published a commemorative edition about Fischer Field that included citizens' thoughts about the renovations and memories of the historic field. Hundreds attended a ribbon-cutting and grand opening celebration, which featured food, entertainment, and tours of the newly renovated stadium.

== Namesake ==
The field is named after "John Curtis Fischer". He was born in Leroy, Kansas, December 11, 1921. He married Betty Lorraine Heath of Madison (DOB 11Nov1922), Kansas. He played football at Emporia State Teachers College in Kansas and was co-captain with "Bernie" Taylor. He graduated from Emporia State in 1943 and subsequently served in the United States Navy as a "90-Day Wonder" officer. He entered and left military service as a Lieutenant J.G. He was on board LST-540 [Landing Ship Tank—a shallow draft ship for close beach approach] on D-Day during the Normandy invasion. Curtis also served in the Pacific Theater until the Japanese surrendered and was honorably discharged after the war.

He coached football and basketball after World War II in Madison, Kansas before moving to Newton, Kansas in 1949. "Curtis", as he was known, coached the first Arkansas Valley Football Championship Team in 1951–2. He loved sports and competition. Funds being sparse he would often go the football field during summer nights to change the sprinklers for the newly planted seeds to help assure a good field in the upcoming fall competition. Curtis also coached track in the spring and was successful in helping a talented runner obtain a scholarship to the University of Missouri. The athlete's name was Henry Wiebe. Henry still holds the 220 yard dash state record of 21.0 seconds. The 220-dash is now run around the curve. Henry also set a state record in the 120-yard high hurdles and broke a national record in the 180-yard low hurdles while finishing second to Charles Tidwell.

Curtis related that his successes where not his own but rather the talent, intelligence and commitment of the young men he mentored. Most of the young with whom Curtis related, both on and off the field of competition, found themselves leading productive lives through his leadership.

Curtis became the Vice-Principal of Newton High School but longed to return to the classroom, which he did, finishing 38 years of teaching and coaching at Chisholm Junior High School. He and Betty had three children, Larry, Ronald (Ron) and Linda. Curtis died in August 1991. His wife Betty was active in attaching his name to the field and sport he loved so well.

Curtis was inducted posthumously into the sports Halls of Fame at both Newton and Emporia State.
