= Newton, Kansas =

City in Harvey County, Kansas

- City and County seat
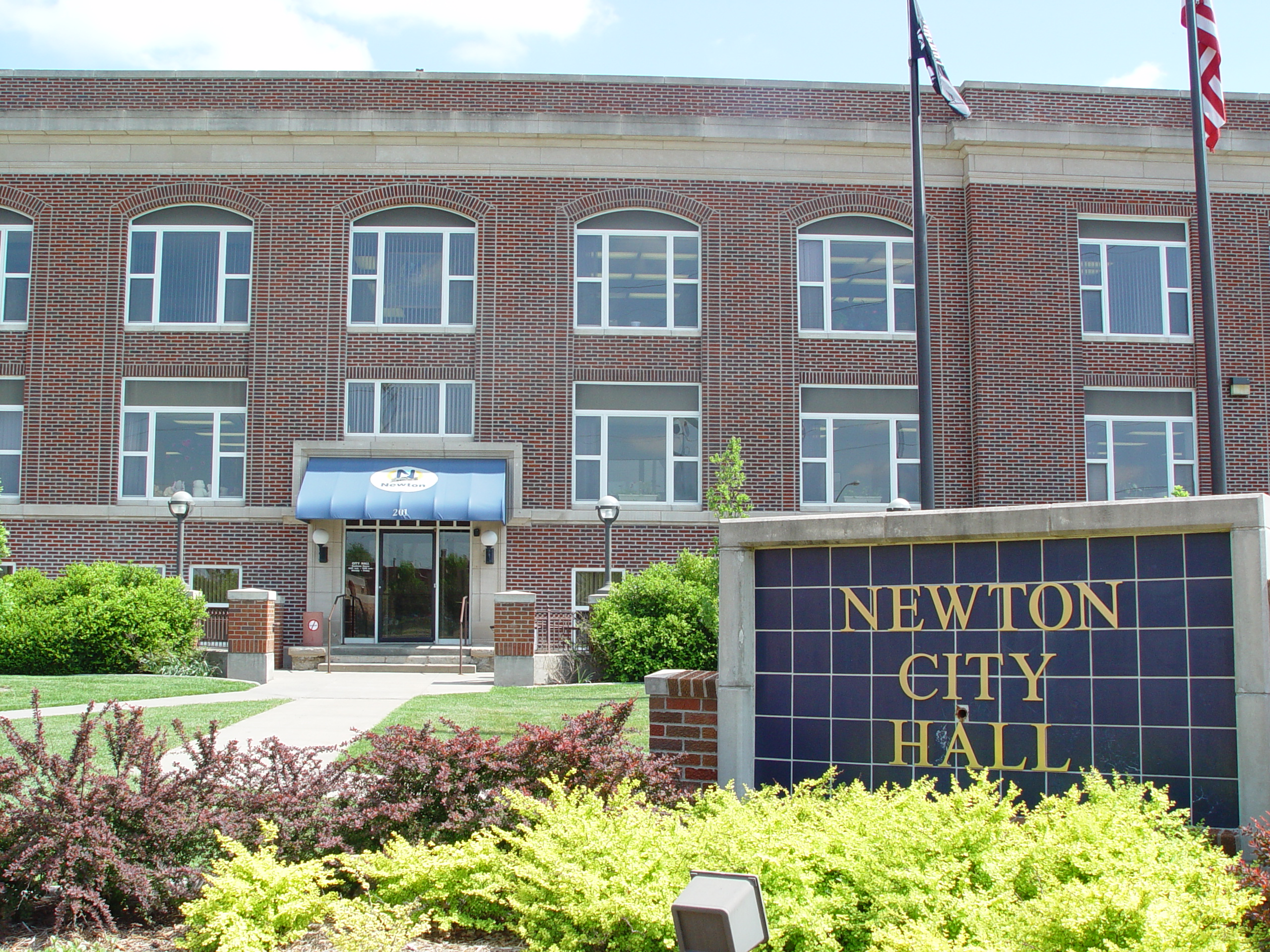
- Newton City Hall at 201 E 6th St (2006)

- Flag

- Location within Harvey County and Kansas

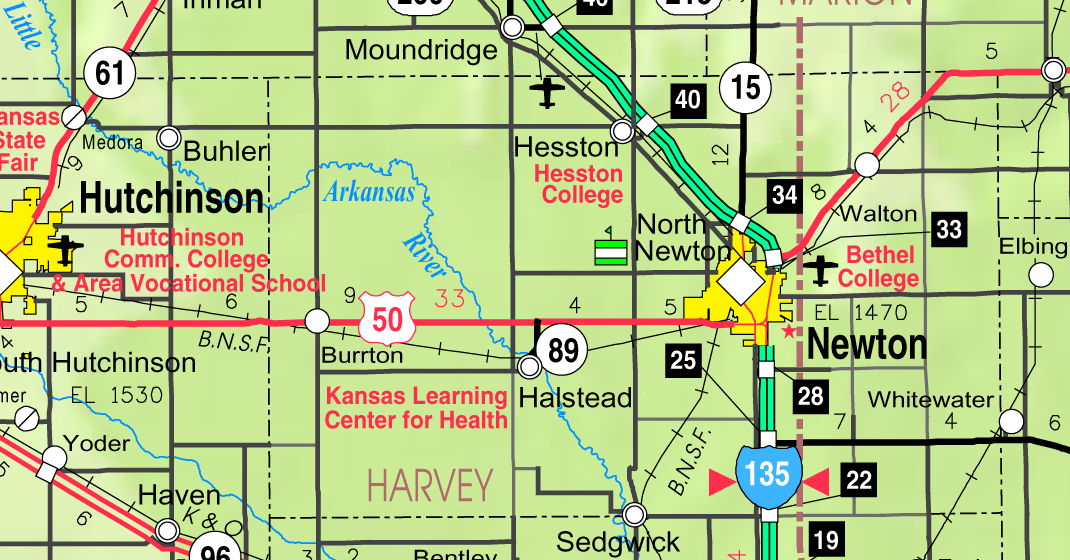
- KDOT map of Harvey County (legend)
- Coordinates: 38°02′14″N 97°20′42″W
- Country: United States
- State: Kansas
- County: Harvey
- Township: Newton
- Founded: 1871
- Incorporated: 1872, 1880
- Named for: Newton, Massachusetts

Government
  - Mayor: Leroy Koehn
  - City Manager: Kelly McElroy

Area
  - Total: 14.57 sq mi (37.73 km^{2})
  - Land: 14.57 sq mi (37.73 km^{2})
  - Water: 0 sq mi (0.00 km^{2})
- Elevation: 1,434 ft (437 m)

Population (2020)
  - Total: 18,602
  - Density: 1,277/sq mi (493.0/km^{2})
- Time zone: UTC-6 (CST)
  - Summer (DST): UTC-5 (CDT)
- ZIP Code: 67114
- Area code: 316
- FIPS code: 20-50475
- GNIS ID: 485629
- Website: newtonkansas.com

Newton is a city in and the county seat of Harvey County, Kansas, United States. As of the 2020 census, the population of the city was 18,602. Newton is located 25 miles (40 km) north of Wichita at the intersection of Interstate 135, U.S. Route 50, and U.S. Route 81 highways. The city of North Newton is located on the north side of Newton and exists as a separate entity.

== History ==
=== 19th century ===
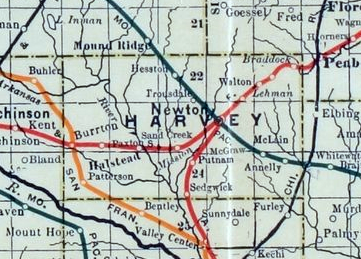
A 1915 railroad map of Harvey County

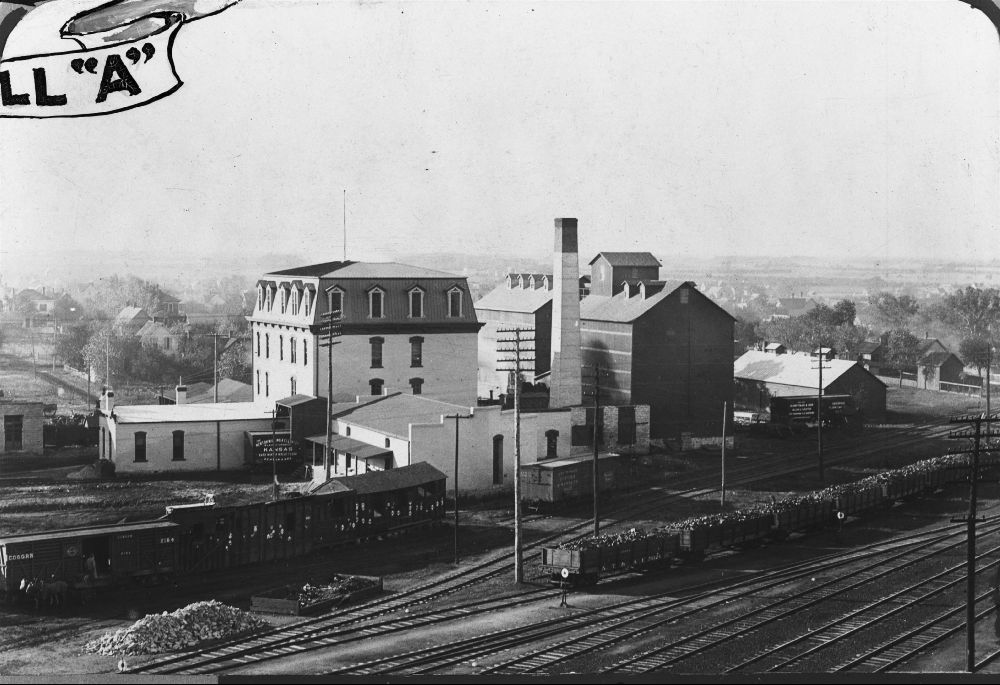
1905 Warkentin Mill

For millennia, the land now known as Kansas was inhabited by Native Americans. In 1803, most of modern Kansas was secured by the United States as part of the Louisiana Purchase. In 1854, the Kansas Territory was organized, then in 1861, Kansas became the 34th U.S. state. In 1872, Harvey County was founded.

In 1871, the Atchison, Topeka and Santa Fe Railway extended a main line from Emporia westward to Newton by July 1871. The town soon became an important railroad shipping point of Texas cattle.

The city was founded in 1871 and named after Newton, Massachusetts, home of some of the Santa Fe stockholders.

In August 1871, the Gunfight at Hide Park occurred, in which eight men were killed. The incident began with an argument between two local lawmen, Billy Bailey and Mike McCluskie. Because of this incident, Newton became known as "bloody and lawless—the wickedest city in the west."

In 1872, the western terminal for the Atchison, Topeka and Santa Fe Railway and the railhead for the Chisholm Trail were established here. Shortly after incorporation of the city in 1872, the Newton city council passed an ordinance prohibiting the running-at-large of buffalo and other wild animals.

=== 20th century ===
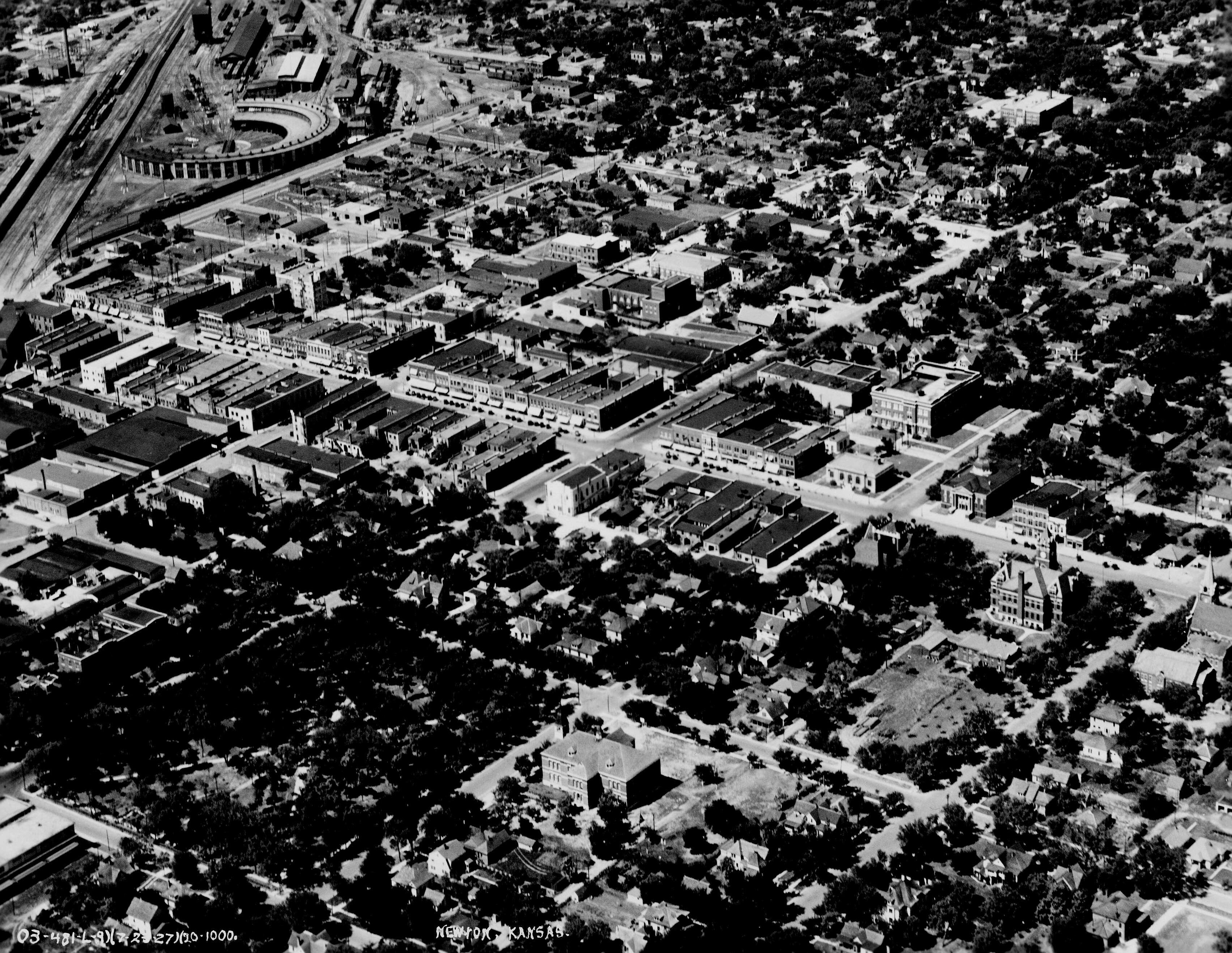
View of the main street, 1920s

During World War II, the Newton airport was taken over by the US Navy as a secondary Naval Air Station, and the main runway was extended to over 7,000 feet (2,100 m).

Newton served as the Middle Division dispatching headquarters for the "Santa Fe" until the mid-1980s, when all dispatching for the Chicago to Los Angeles system was centralized in the Chicago area. In 1995, the Santa Fe merged with the Burlington Northern Railroad, and is now known as the BNSF Railway. The BNSF continues to be a large industrial taxpayer, although its impact as an employer has decreased in the past decade.

=== 21st century ===
On February 25, 2016, Newton was the site of the first of several related shooting incidents, which culminated in a mass shooting at an Excel Industries building in nearby Hesston that left three people dead and 12 others injured. The shooter, identified as Excel employee Cedric Larry Ford, was then killed by a responding police officer.

== Geography ==
According to the United States Census Bureau, the city has a total area of 12.60 square miles (32.63 km^{2}), all land.

The city is in the central portion of the continental United States. U.S. Highway 81, also known as the Meridian Highway, stretches from Winnipeg, Manitoba, Canada, to Mexico City, Mexico, through Central and South America. It passes through Newton, Kansas, where it is known as Main Street. U.S. Highway 50 runs past the White House in Washington, DC, through Newton, Kansas, and continues on to Sacramento, California.

=== Climate ===
The climate in this area is characterized by hot, humid summers and generally mild to cool winters. According to the Köppen climate classification, Newton has a humid subtropical climate, Cfa on climate maps.

Climate data for Newton, Kansas, 1991–2020 normals, extremes 1897–present
Month	Jan	Feb	Mar	Apr	May	Jun	Jul	Aug	Sep	Oct	Nov	Dec	Year
Record high °F (°C)	75 (24)	85 (29)	93 (34)	97 (36)	103 (39)	112 (44)	117 (47)	115 (46)	108 (42)	98 (37)	88 (31)	81 (27)	117 (47)
Mean maximum °F (°C)	64.5 (18.1)	70.0 (21.1)	78.9 (26.1)	85.2 (29.6)	92.3 (33.5)	97.9 (36.6)	103.2 (39.6)	101.8 (38.8)	96.9 (36.1)	88.7 (31.5)	74.9 (23.8)	64.3 (17.9)	104.4 (40.2)
Mean daily maximum °F (°C)	41.7 (5.4)	46.6 (8.1)	57.3 (14.1)	66.9 (19.4)	76.3 (24.6)	87.0 (30.6)	92.0 (33.3)	90.3 (32.4)	82.5 (28.1)	69.7 (20.9)	55.7 (13.2)	43.9 (6.6)	67.5 (19.7)
Daily mean °F (°C)	31.0 (−0.6)	35.2 (1.8)	45.2 (7.3)	54.9 (12.7)	65.5 (18.6)	76.0 (24.4)	80.9 (27.2)	79.0 (26.1)	70.7 (21.5)	57.7 (14.3)	44.4 (6.9)	33.9 (1.1)	56.2 (13.4)
Mean daily minimum °F (°C)	20.3 (−6.5)	23.8 (−4.6)	33.1 (0.6)	42.9 (6.1)	54.7 (12.6)	65.0 (18.3)	69.8 (21.0)	67.6 (19.8)	59.0 (15.0)	45.7 (7.6)	33.2 (0.7)	23.9 (−4.5)	44.9 (7.2)
Mean minimum °F (°C)	2.8 (−16.2)	6.3 (−14.3)	15.1 (−9.4)	26.7 (−2.9)	39.4 (4.1)	52.3 (11.3)	59.3 (15.2)	56.8 (13.8)	43.0 (6.1)	28.6 (−1.9)	16.2 (−8.8)	7.0 (−13.9)	−1.5 (−18.6)
Record low °F (°C)	−20 (−29)	−28 (−33)	−7 (−22)	10 (−12)	23 (−5)	40 (4)	43 (6)	43 (6)	29 (−2)	10 (−12)	−4 (−20)	−20 (−29)	−28 (−33)
Average precipitation inches (mm)	0.80 (20)	1.25 (32)	2.38 (60)	2.92 (74)	4.89 (124)	5.01 (127)	4.20 (107)	3.89 (99)	2.98 (76)	2.64 (67)	1.65 (42)	1.16 (29)	33.77 (857)
Average snowfall inches (cm)	2.1 (5.3)	1.3 (3.3)	1.2 (3.0)	0.3 (0.76)	0.0 (0.0)	0.0 (0.0)	0.0 (0.0)	0.0 (0.0)	0.0 (0.0)	0.1 (0.25)	0.6 (1.5)	3.2 (8.1)	8.8 (22.21)
Average precipitation days (≥ 0.01 in)	4.2	4.8	7.1	7.7	9.7	8.5	8.3	7.8	6.4	6.6	4.9	5.0	81.0
Average snowy days (≥ 0.1 in)	1.6	1.4	0.6	0.2	0.0	0.0	0.0	0.0	0.0	0.1	0.4	1.5	5.8
Source 1: NOAA
Source 2: National Weather Service

== Demographics ==
Historical population
Census	Pop.	Note	%±
1880	2,601		—
1890	5,605		115.5%
1900	6,208		10.8%
1910	7,862		26.6%
1920	9,781		24.4%
1930	11,034		12.8%
1940	11,048		0.1%
1950	11,590		4.9%
1960	14,877		28.4%
1970	15,439		3.8%
1980	16,332		5.8%
1990	16,700		2.3%
2000	17,190		2.9%
2010	19,132		11.3%
2020	18,602		−2.8%
2023 (est.)	18,251		−1.9%
U.S. Decennial Census; 2010-2020

Newton is included in the Wichita metropolitan statistical area. It is located in Harvey County, which is an agricultural and small manufacturing county with 34,361 people. Harvey County is part of a five-county metropolitan area with 650,000 people, the largest anchored in the state of Kansas. The major city in this metro area is Wichita, 20 miles to the south via I-135.

=== 2020 census ===
As of the 2020 census, Newton had a population of 18,602 with 7,501 households and 4,798 families. The population density was 1,276.4 inhabitants per square mile (492.8/km^{2}). There were 8,256 housing units at an average density of 566.5 per square mile (218.7/km^{2}); 9.1% of housing units were vacant, with a homeowner vacancy rate of 2.5% and a rental vacancy rate of 11.0%.

The median age was 39.2 years. The age distribution was 24.1% under 18; 8.2% from 18 to 24; 24.6% from 25 to 44; 23.8% from 45 to 64; and 19.3% 65 or older. For every 100 females there were 96.2 males, and for every 100 females age 18 and over there were 93.6 males age 18 and over.

Of the 7,501 households, 29.4% had children under the age of 18 living in them. About 47.2% were married-couple households, 19.1% were households with a male householder and no spouse or partner present, and 27.2% were households with a female householder and no spouse or partner present. Approximately 31.2% of all households were made up of individuals, and 13.9% had someone living alone who was 65 years of age or older. The average household size was 2.4, and the average family size was 3.0.

99.6% of residents lived in urban areas, while 0.4% lived in rural areas.

Non-Hispanic Whites accounted for 73.1% of the population, and Hispanics or Latinos of any race were 17.8%.

Racial composition as of the 2020 census
Race	Number	Percent
White	14,657	78.8%
Black or African American	471	2.5%
American Indian and Alaska Native	188	1.0%
Asian	164	0.9%
Native Hawaiian and Other Pacific Islander	4	0.0%
Some other race	1,250	6.7%
Two or more races	1,868	10.0%
Hispanic or Latino (of any race)	3,306	17.8%

The percentage of those with a bachelor's degree or higher was estimated to be 21.5% of the population.

The 2016–2020 five-year American Community Survey estimates show that the median household income was $56,729 (with a margin of error of +/- $2,501) and the median family income was $66,806 (+/- $5,072). Males had a median income of $41,413 (+/- $3,677) versus $29,782 (+/- $3,872) for females. The median income for those above 16 years old was $35,192 (+/- $2,644). Approximately, 6.7% of families and 10.8% of the population were below the poverty line, including 12.7% of those under 18 and 9.4% of those 65 or over.

=== 2010 census ===
As of the census of 2010, 19,132 people, 7,584 households, and 5,045 families were living in the city. The population density was 1,518.4 inhabitants per square mile (586.3/km^{2}). The 8,237 housing units had an average density of 653.7 per square mile (252.4/km^{2}). The racial makeup of the city was 88.4% White, 2.2% African American, 0.9% Native American, 0.8% Asian, 4.7% from other races, and 2.9% from two or more races. Hispanics or Latinos of any race were 16.3% of the population.

Of the 7,584 households, 33.1% had children under 18 living with them, 51.5% were married couples living together, 10.3% had a female householder with no husband present, 4.7% had a male householder with no wife present, and 33.5% were not families. About 29.1% of all households were made up of individuals, and 12.3% had someone living alone who was 65 or older. The average household size was 2.46 and the average family size was 3.01.

The median age in the city was 36.8 years, and the age distribution was 26.4% under 18; 7.9% from 18 to 24; 24.9% from 25 to 44; 25% from 45 to 64; and 15.9% were 65 or older. The gender makeup of the city was 48.4% male and 51.6% female.

== Area attractions ==
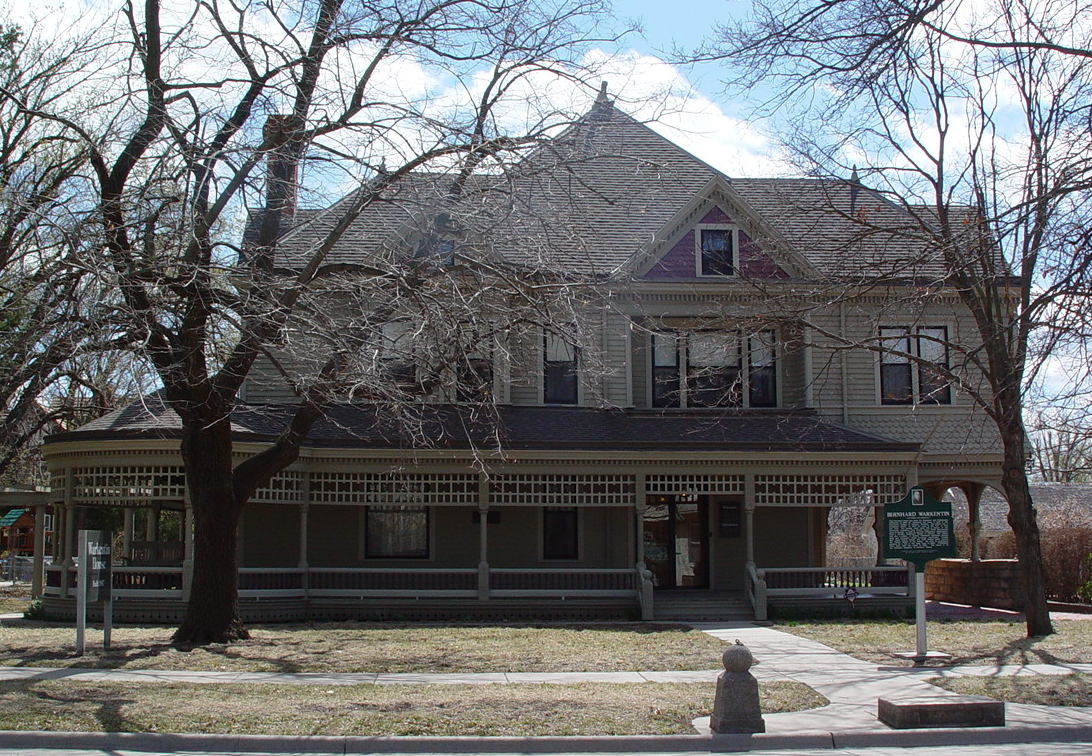
1886 Warkentin House (2007)

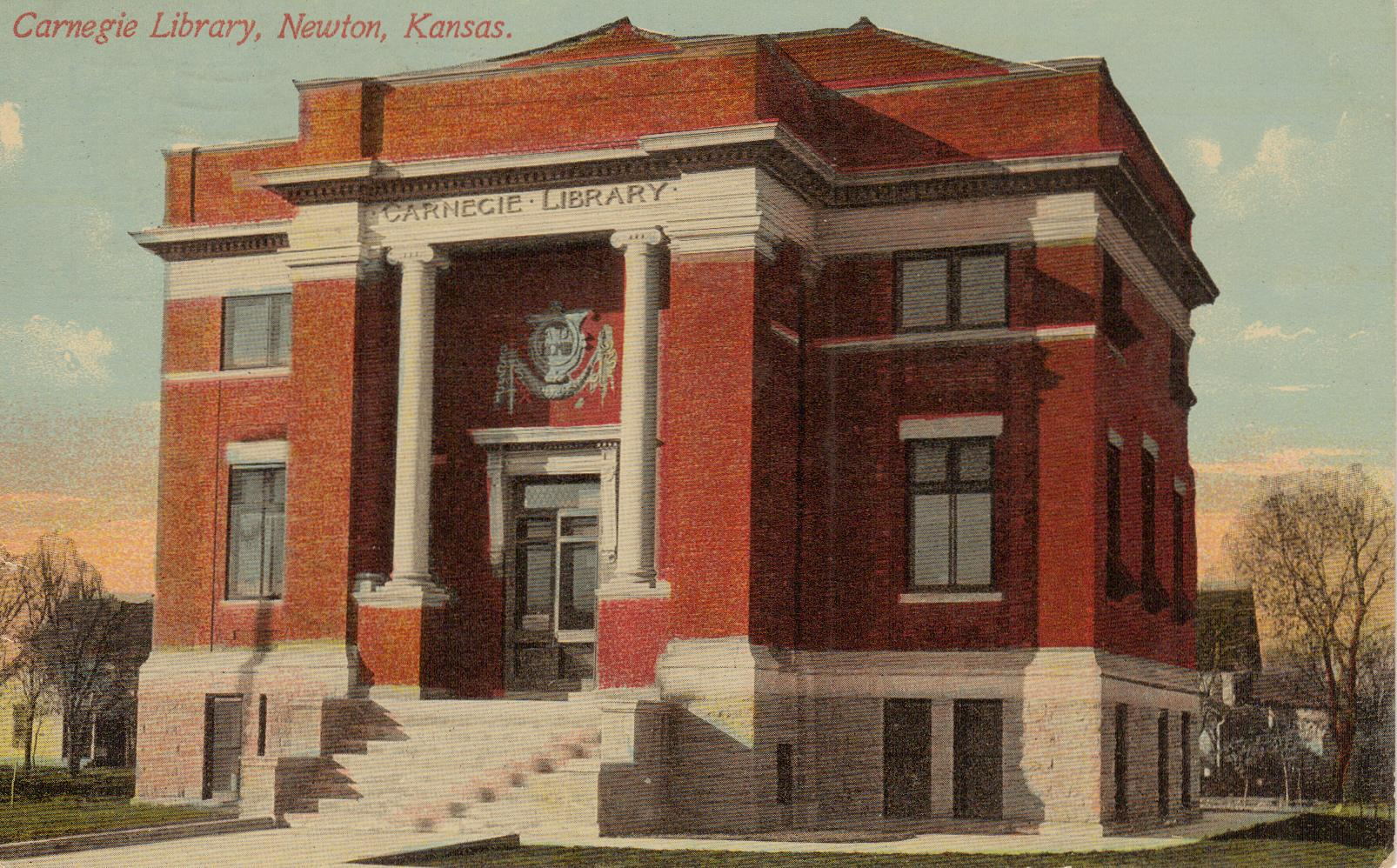
Former Newton Carnegie Library, now Harvey County Historical Society Library and Museum (1912 postcard)

- Harvey County Historical Society Library and Museum
- Kauffman Museum
- Warkentin House, a Victorian house museum.
- Mennonite Settler statue
- Blue Sky Sculpture, one of the Eight Wonders of Kansas Art
- Sand Creek Trail
- Carriage Factory Art Gallery
- Sand Creek Station Golf Course, an 18-hole public course, was ranked among 2006's best new public courses in America by Golf Digest.

== Education ==
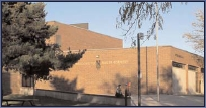
Newton High School (2006)

=== Primary and secondary education ===
The community is served by Newton USD 373 public school district. Newton public schools consist of:

High school

- Newton High School

Intermediate schools

- Santa Fe 5/6 Center
- Chisholm Middle School

Elementary

- Northridge Elementary
- Slate Creek Elementary
- South Breeze Elementary
- Sunset Elementary.

Early education

- Cooper Early Education

Private

Newton has two kindergarten - grade-8 private schools:

- St. Mary's Catholic School
- Newton Bible Christian School

=== College ===
- Bethel College is located nearby in the city of North Newton.
- Hutchinson Community College has a satellite campus at the Axtell Education Center, close to downtown.

== Media ==
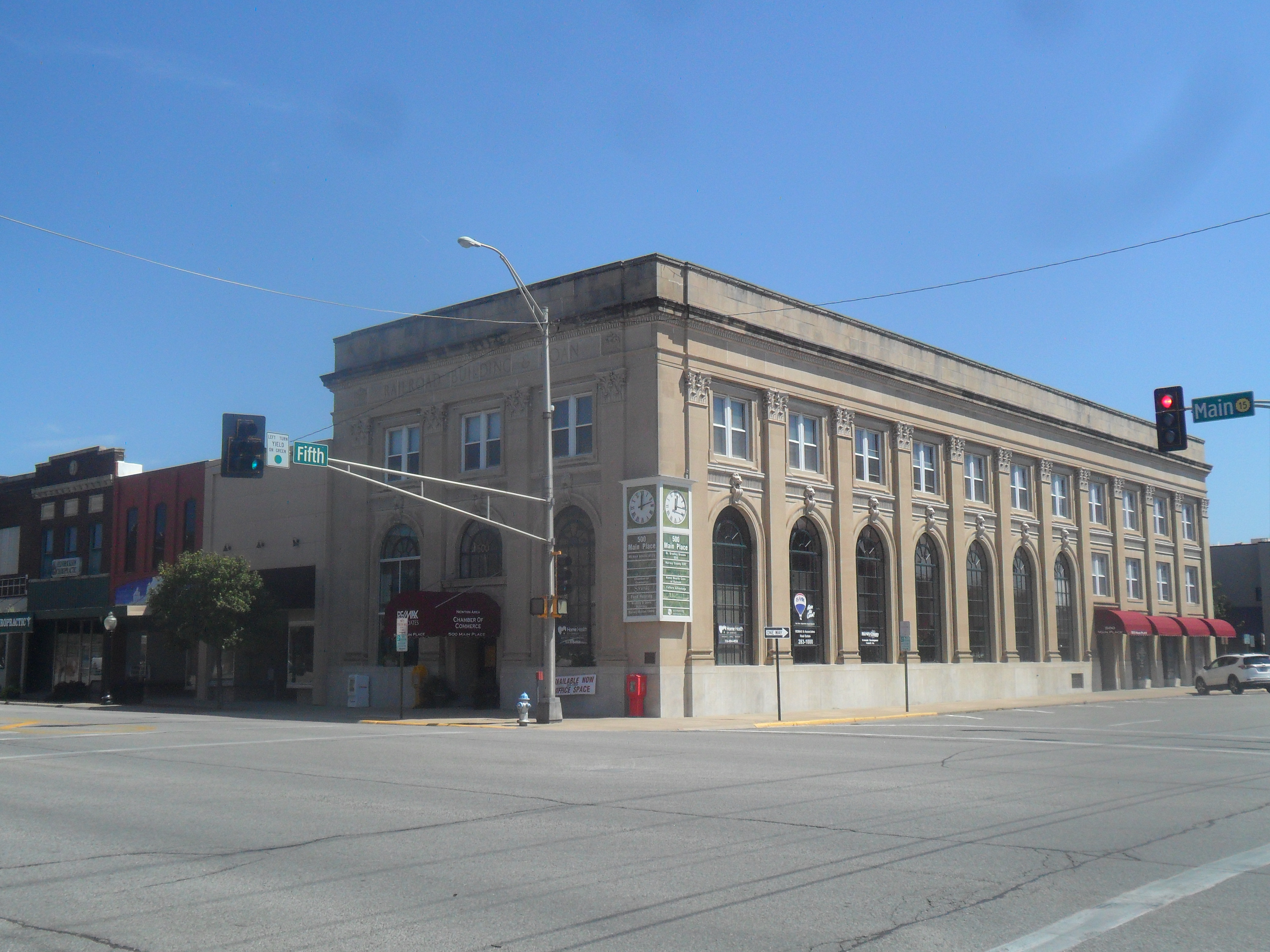
Railroad Savings and Loan Building, across street from rail depot (2018)

=== Print media ===
The Newton Kansan serves Newton and the surrounding area as the daily local newspaper.

The Wichita Eagle is the major newspaper for the region.

=== Radio ===
- AM
  - KJRG-AM 950 kHz, Christian talk
- FM
  - KKGQ-FM 92.3 MHz, ESPN Wichita 92.3, sports programming
  - KBCU-FM 88.1 MHz - Bethel College (Kansas) - College events and jazz music

=== Television ===
Newton is served by over-the-air ATSC digital TV of the Wichita-Hutchinson viewing market area, cable TV by Cox Communications, and satellite TV. See Media in Wichita, Kansas.

== Infrastructure ==
=== Transportation ===
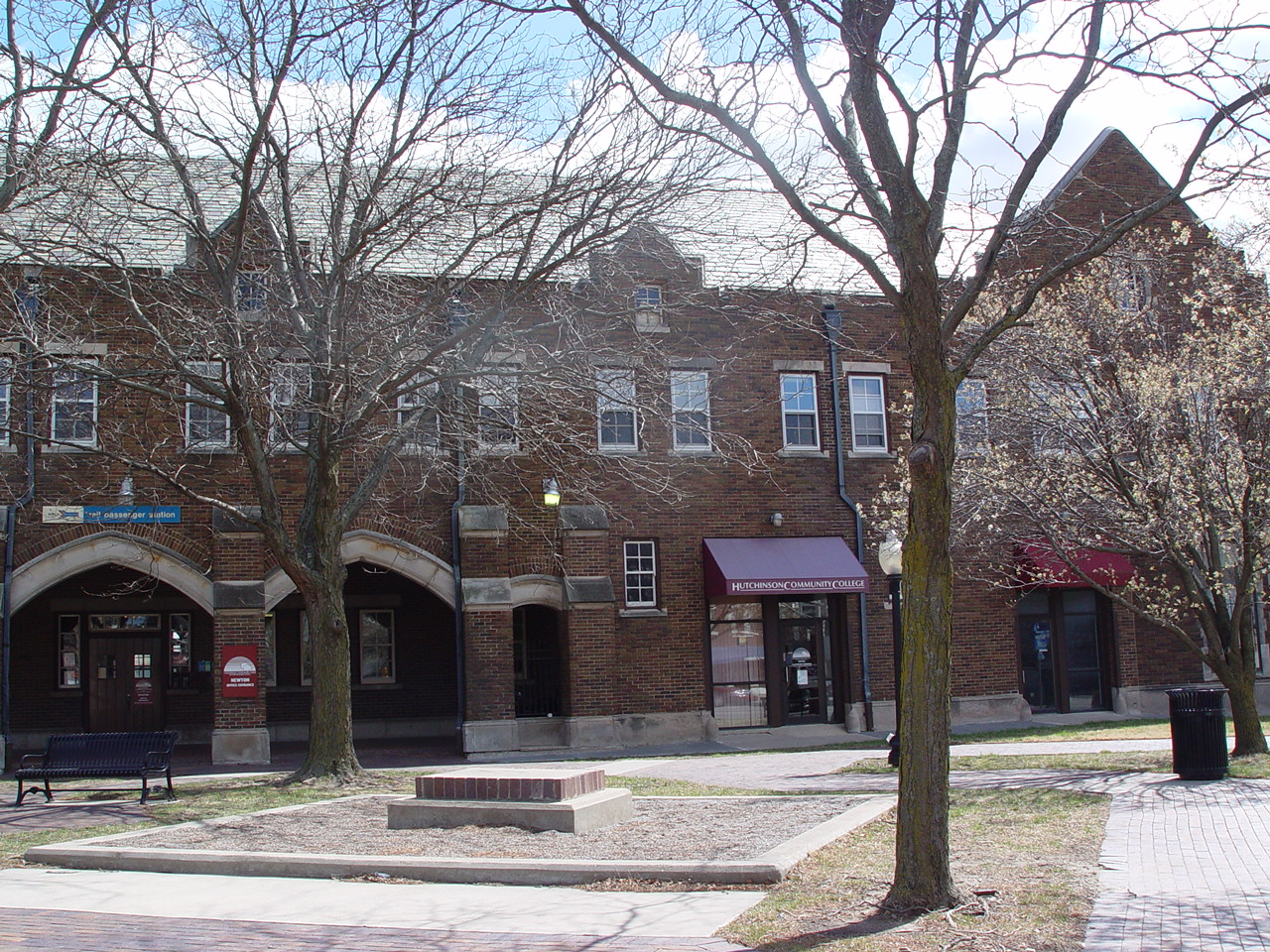
Newton Amtrak Depot at 414 N. Main St. (2006)

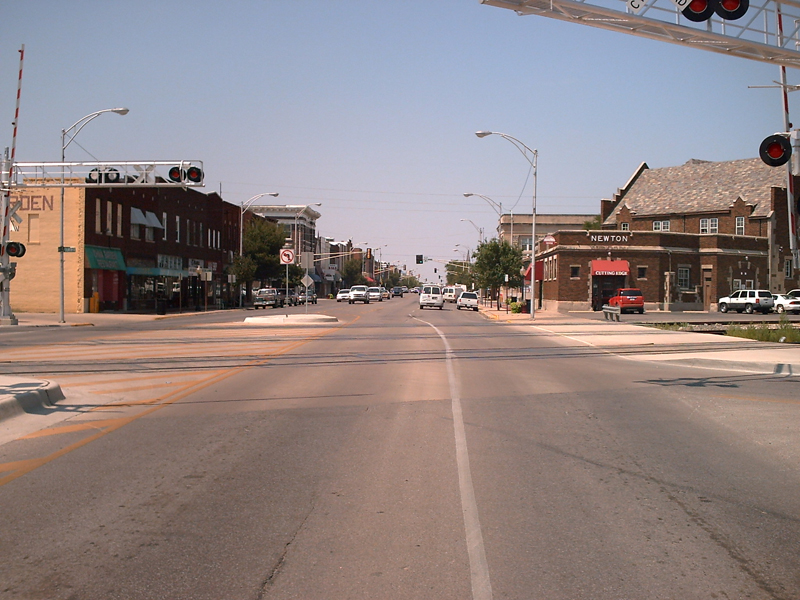
Downtown Newton (looking north). Depot on right. (2006)

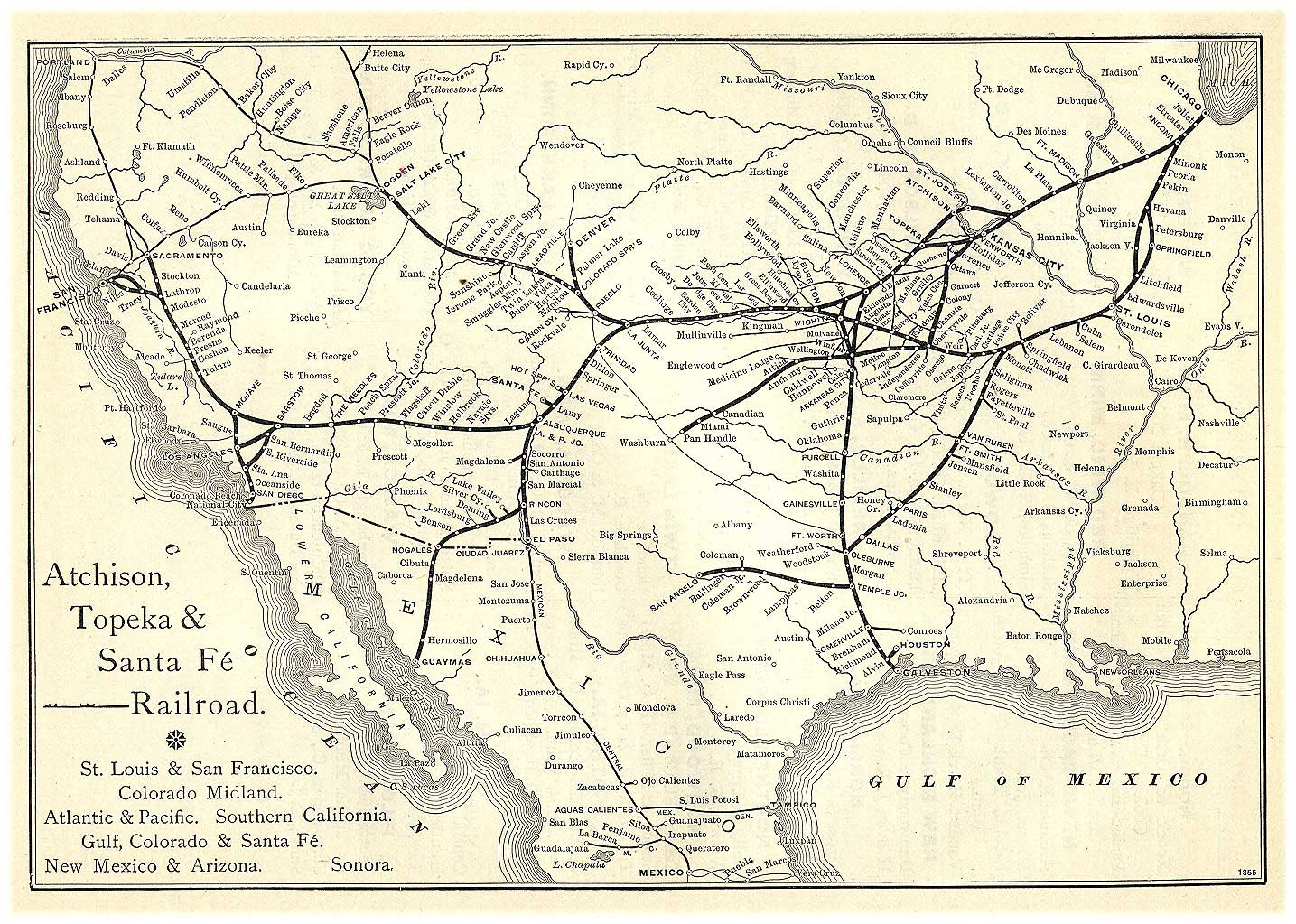
An Atchison, Topeka & Santa Fe Railway route map from 1891 issue of Grain Dealers and Shippers Gazetteer.

BNSF Railway passes through Newton for transportation and shipping. Amtrak's Southwest Chief stops in Newton twice each day and provides passenger rail service towards Los Angeles and Chicago. The Amtrak station is located at 414 N Main St.

Bus service is provided daily towards Wichita and Salina by BeeLine Express (subcontractor of Greyhound Lines). While there is no local fixed-route transit service, Harvey Interurban provides dial-a-ride transit service to the community.

Major roads that pass through Newton are I-135, US-50, US-81, and K-15.

Newton City/County Airport, FAA:EWK, is located 2 miles east of Newton. Its 7,002-foot (2,134 m) runway is one of only 11 runways in Kansas 7,000-foot (2,100 m) or longer. It has ILS and GPS approaches.

=== Utilities ===
- Internet
  - Cable is provided by Cox.
  - Fiber is provided by Ideatek.
  - Wireless is provided by Ideatek, Pixius.
  - Satellite is provided by HughesNet, StarBand, WildBlue.
- TV
  - Cable is provided by Cox.
  - Satellite is provided by DirecTV, Dish Network.
  - Terrestrial is provided by regional digital TV stations primarily based in the Wichita/Hutchinson designated market area.
- Telephone
  - Landline is provided by AT&T.
  - Cellular is provided by AT&T, Verizon.
- Electricity is provided by Evergy.
- Gas is provided by Kansas Gas Service.
- Water
  - City is provided by City of Newton.
  - Rural is provided by Harvey County RWD #1.
- Sewer is billed by City of Newton.
- Trash is billed by City of Newton.

== Notable people ==
See also List of people from Harvey County, Kansas

- Tom Adair (1913–1988), screenwriter, musician, and composer
- Donna Atwood (1925–2010), figure skater and Ice Capades star
- Errett Bishop (1928–1983), mathematician, college professor
- Tony Clark (born 1972), MLB first baseman and union executive
- Rita Clements (1931–2018), was an American Republican Party organizer, an activist in historic preservation, and a First Lady of the State of Texas
- Reed Crandall (1917–1982), illustrator and penciller of comic books and magazines, was inducted into Will Eisner Comic Book Hall of Fame in 2009
- James Earp (1841–1926), brother of Wyatt Earp and Virgil Earp
- Harold Foster (1906–1996), head coach of Wisconsin Badgers men's basketball team, member of Naismith Memorial Basketball Hall of Fame
- Orville Harrold, opera singer
- Wyatt Hendrickson, 285# Champion at the 2025 NCAA Division I Men's Wrestling Championships, is a second lieutenant in the United States Air Force
- Elizabeth Hoisington (1918–2007), United States Army officer, one of two women to first attain the rank of brigadier general
- John Houston (1890–1975), politician and mayor of Newton
- John Janzen (born 1937), professor of anthropology and author
- Miles Johns (born 1994), a mixed martial artist, is currently competing the UFC's bantam-weight division
- Ruth Mitten (1876–1942), educator, superintendent of schools
- Samuel Peters (1842–1910), captain in Union Army (1861–1865), Kansas State Senate (1874–1875), judge of 9th District (1875–1883), U.S. House of Representatives (1883–1891), editor of Newton Daily Kansas-Republican (1899), postmaster in Newton (1898–1910), and lawyer in Newton and Marion
- Dustin Richardson (born 1984), MLB pitcher
- Jacob Schowalter (1879–1953), philanthropist, founder of Schowalter Foundation, Kansas state representative
- Jesse Unruh (1922–1987), California politician
- Mike Wellman (born 1956), NFL center
- Dallas Wiebe (1930–2009), writer
- John Yoder (1951–2017), Kansas and West Virginia state court judge, West Virginia state senator

== See also ==
- Abilene Trail
- Arkansas Valley Interurban Railway
- Chisholm Trail
- La Junta Subdivision, branch of the BNSF Railway
- National Register of Historic Places listings in Harvey County, Kansas
  - Carnegie Library
  - Mennonite Settler statue
  - Newton Stadium
  - Santa Fe Depot
