= Mennonite Settler statue =

- Mennonite Settler Statue
- U.S. National Register of Historic Places
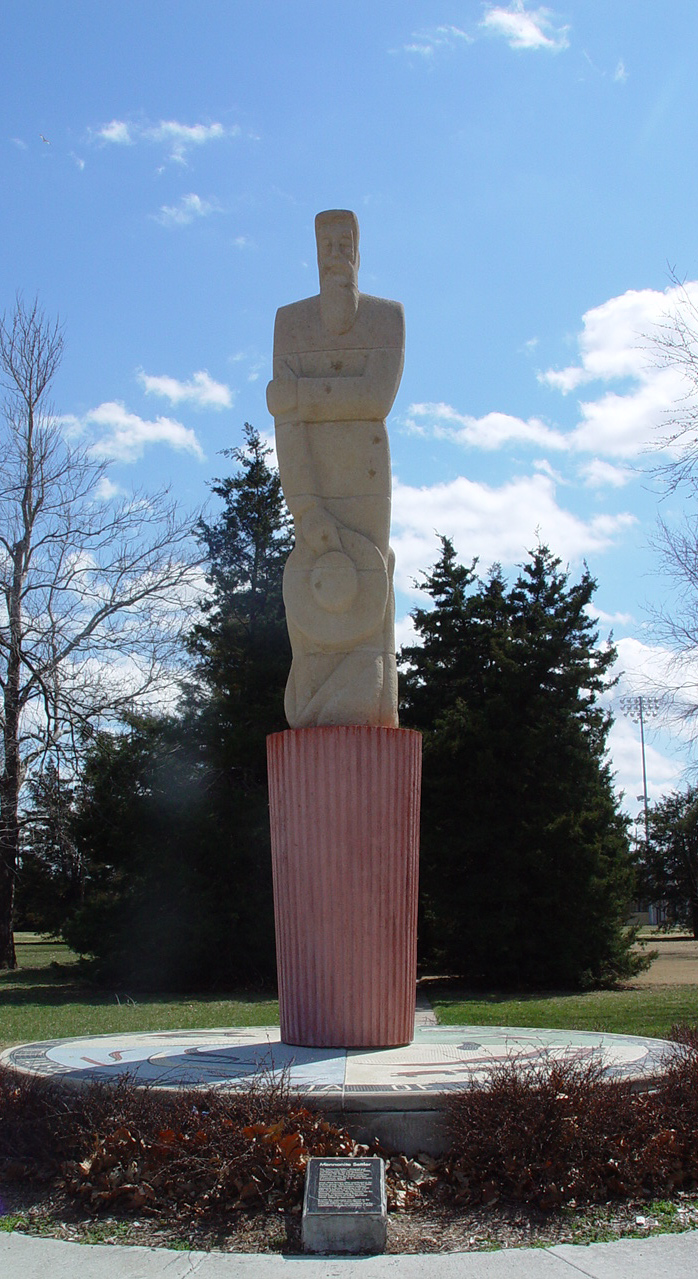
- Mennonite Settler

- Location within Kansas Location within the United States
- Location: Newton, KS
- Coordinates: 38°02′46″N 97°21′24″W
- Built: 1942
- Architect: Max Nixon
- NRHP reference No.: 98000084
- Added to NRHP: February 26, 1998

The Mennonite Settler is a 17-foot limestone statue in Newton, Kansas, honoring Mennonite farmers and their wheat heritage.

The statue was crafted in 1942 by Topeka artist Max Nixon out of native Kansas limestone. It depicts a bearded Mennonite farmer with hat in hand, in an attitude of prayer. The sculpture rests on a mosaic tile base with the inscription "Commemorating entry into Kansas from Russia of Turkey Red Hard Wheat by Mennonites 1874." The statue commemorates the introduction from Russia of Turkey Red hard winter wheat by Mennonite settlers, which helped make Kansas the "breadbasket of America." The statue was jointly financed through a community fundraising drive and a Works Progress Administration (WPA) art project.

The statue was listed on the National Register of Historic Places in 1998 and underwent an extensive three-year restoration that was completed in 2000.

The mosaic tile base is about 10 feet (3.0 m) in diameter.

== See also ==
- Anabaptist settlers
