= Walton =

Walton may refer to:

== People ==
- Walton (given name)
- Walton (surname)
- Susana, Lady Walton (1926–2010), Argentine writer

== Places ==
=== Canada ===
- Walton, Nova Scotia, a community
- Walton, Ontario, a hamlet

=== United Kingdom ===
- Walton, Aylesbury, Buckinghamshire
- Walton, Milton Keynes, Buckinghamshire, a residential area and civil parish
- Walton, Peterborough, a residential area and electoral ward of the city of Peterborough, Cambridgeshire
- Walton, Cheshire, a village and civil parish
- Walton, Cumbria, a village and civil parish
- Walton, Chesterfield, Derbyshire, a suburb of Chesterfield
- Walton-on-Trent, South Derbyshire, Derbyshire
- Walton-on-the-Naze, Essex, a seafront town informally called "Walton"
- Walton, Leicestershire, a village
- Walton, Liverpool, an area of Liverpool, Merseyside
- Walton Street, London
- East Walton, Norfolk
- West Walton, Norfolk
- Walton, North East Derbyshire, a village in the civil parish of Holymoorside and Walton
- Walton Manor, Oxford
  - Walton Street, Oxford
- Walton, Powys, a village in Wales
- Walton, Onibury, a location in Shropshire
- Walton, Telford and Wrekin, a location in Shropshire
- Walton, Somerset, near Street
- Walton in Gordano, Somerset
- Walton, Eccleshall, a location in Staffordshire
- Walton, Stone, a location in Staffordshire
- Walton, Suffolk, a settlement
- Walton-on-Thames, Surrey
- Walton-on-the-Hill, Surrey
- Walton, Warwickshire, a hamlet
- Walton, Leeds, a village and civil parish
- Walton, Wakefield, West Yorkshire
- Walton Hill, a hill in Worcestershire

=== United States ===
- Walton, Kentucky, a home rule-class city
- Walton, Michigan, an unincorporated community
- Walton (town), New York
  - Walton (village), New York, within the town
- Walton, Oregon, an unincorporated community
- Walton, Texas, an unincorporated community
- Walton, West Virginia, an unincorporated community
- Walton Mountain, Montana

=== Elsewhere ===
- Walton, New South Wales, Australia
- Walton, Lahore, Pakistan, a cantonment area outside Lahore
  - Walton Airport
- Walton, New Zealand, a settlement on the North Island
- Walton Mountains, Antarctica
- Walton fault zone, Caribbean Sea

== Businesses ==
- Walton Group, a Bangladeshi conglomerate
  - Walton Hi-Tech Industries Limited
  - Walton Micro-Tech Corporation
  - Walton Motors

== Schools ==
- Sam M. Walton College of Business, aka Walton College, the business college at the University of Arkansas in Fayetteville, Arkansas
- Walton High School (disambiguation), various schools in the UK and the United States

== Other uses ==
- Walton (barque), a 19th-century Canadian ship
- Walton (horse) (1799–1825), a British Thoroughbred racehorse
- Bud Walton Arena, a basketball arena at the University of Arkansas, Fayetteville, Arkansas
- Walton Arts Center, a performing arts center in Fayetteville, Arkansas
- Walton Centre, a neurology hospital in the suburb of Fazakerley in the city of Liverpool, England
- Walton Correctional Institution, Walton County, Florida
- Walton Rowing Club, an amateur rowing club on the River Thames in England
- Walton War, an 1804 boundary dispute between the U.S. states of North Carolina and Georgia

== See also ==
- Walton County (disambiguation), United States
- Walton Hall (disambiguation)
- Walton House (disambiguation)
- Walton-on-the-Hill, Surrey
- Walton-on-the-Hill, Staffordshire
- Walton-on-the-Naze, Essex
- Walton on the Wolds, Leicestershire
- Walton-on-Thames, Surrey
- Walton-on-Trent, Derbyshire
- Walton station (disambiguation)
- Walton Township (disambiguation), United States
- Waltons (disambiguation)
- The Waltons (disambiguation)
- Wolton (disambiguation)
