= Agricultural education =

Training in farming, natural resources, and land management

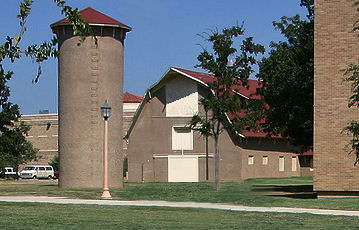
The Texas Technological College Dairy Barn was used as an agricultural teaching facility until 1967.

Agricultural education is the systematic and organized teaching, instruction and training (theoretical as well as hands-on, real-world fieldwork-based) available to students, farmers or individuals interested in the science, business and technology of agriculture (animal and plant production) as well as the management of land, environment and natural resources.

Agricultural education is part of the curriculum of primary and secondary schools along with tertiary institutions such as colleges, universities and vocational and technical schools. Agricultural education resources are provided by youth organizations, farm apprenticeships and internships, non-profit organizations, and government agencies and ministries, as well as by agricultural workshops, training programs, shows, fairs, and research institutions. Online/distance learning programs are also available. In institutions, agricultural education serves as preparation for employment or careers in the farming and agricultural sector.

Students learn about general principles of land management, soil science, pasture management. As well as the principles of agricultural economics, plant growth (plant physiology and how plants transport materials, reproduce and germinate), crop production (land preparation, cultivation of cash crops, crop selection, planting and maintenance), and protection (weed, pest and disease control, integrated pest management and the responsible use of farm chemicals). In addition to livestock anatomy and physiology, production (livestock housing, nutrition and health management for the well-being of animals and optimal production), and breeding.

Students who pursue higher education in colleges and universities are provided with more in-depth and focused education so that they can develop expertise in specialized areas such as animal science (physiology, nutrition, reproduction and health aspects of domesticated animals such as dairy cattle, sheep, poultry, etc.), food science (sustainable food, food safety, physiochemical and biological aspects of food, etc.), genetics (animal and plant genetics and genomics and their application in breeding and biotechnology), international agriculture (global perspective on international agribusiness, global food systems, water and energy issues, cropping systems in different regions), Farm business management (budgeting, marketing, planning and other skills necessary to manage the financial and business aspects of agricultural operations), sustainable and organic agriculture. Horticulture, turf grass management, small animal welfare, etc. can also be taught.

The main purposes of agricultural education encompass building a skilled agricultural workforce through training and preparation of future farmers and agricultural professionals, promotion of sustainable and responsible agricultural practices, enhancement of food security, development of cutting-edge agricultural technologists, innovators and leaders, improvement of awareness and understanding of agriculture to bridge the gap between the source of food and the broader community of consumers, contribution to rural economic development and growth, and strengthening the connection between urban and rural agricultural communities.

Historically, farming techniques and knowledge were passed down through oral traditions. In 19th century, agricultural education was formalized as an academic discipline through the Morrill Acts in the United States. Over the years, it slowly subsumed a broad range of scientific subjects related to animals, plants and crops, soil, business, food, land, natural resources and environment. In recent decades agricultural education has been adapted to address the issues of new technology, global perspectives and food security. Recent technological advancements discussed in agricultural education include the integration of precision agriculture, biotechnology, advanced machinery and data-driven approaches to optimize production, reduce resource wastage, improve overall efficiency, and minimize agriculture's ecological footprint. In the future, online learning, interdisciplinary research, community outreach and preparation for diverse career opportunities will also play a crucial role in addressing the evolving challenges of the agricultural sector.

Disciplines closely tied to agricultural education include agricultural communications, agricultural leadership, and extension education.

== United States ==
The chief sources of agriculture education in the United States are high schools, community colleges, four-year colleges and universities, youth organizations, and the 10x15 program.

=== History ===
The rapid growth of agricultural education began during the late 19th century. In 1862, the United States Congress created the Department of Agriculture to gather and distribute agricultural information. The Morrill Act, which provided the land-grant schools, became law that same year. The Hatch Act of 1887 gave federal funds to establish agricultural experiment stations. The first dairy school in the U.S. was created at the University of Wisconsin–Madison in 1891.

Government support for agricultural education has increased during the 20th century. For example, the Smith-Lever Act of 1914 created what is now the Cooperative Extension System. The Smith-Hughes Act of 1917 and the George-Barden Act of 1946 financed high-school instruction in farming. Woodlawn High School (Woodlawn, Virginia) was the first public high school in the United States to offer agricultural education classes under the Smith-Hughes Act. The Vocational Education Act of 1963 funded training in other fields of agriculture.

Agricultural science and education expanded after 1900 in response to a need for more technical knowledge and skill in the use of newly developed agricultural technologies. This development led to the use of modern farming methods that required fewer farmworkers, resulting in larger, corporatized farms and ranches. This development increased the need for more agriculture science and education.

Other legislation influenced the development of agricultural education into what the field is today. It has developed throughout the last century from various laws and pieces of legislation.

The Education for All Handicapped Children Act of 1975 required all public schools to provide a free and appropriate education to all students with disabilities. Under this provision, children with disabilities were now allowed to enroll in agricultural classes. The Americans with Disabilities Act, enacted in 1990, further required public schools to give students with disabilities equal opportunity for education to all other children in the country, and as a result, it increased opportunities for students with disabilities participate in agricultural classes.

Educate America Act of 1994 raised benchmark standards for public education at the districts level, increasing curriculum and development requirements for all classes, including agricultural ones. The School-to-Work Opportunities Act, also of 1994, required teachers to teach students tasks and disciplines that would help their students prepare for employment once they graduated, of which practical education in agriculture was a major part. Finally, No Child Left Behind (Elementary and Secondary Education Act of 2001) further raised standards for students in public schools and increased requirements of teachers in order to reach these standards, affecting agricultural education as part of the general curriculum of many schools.

=== Elementary school ===
In 2006, Walton Rural Life Center in Walton, Kansas was the first public elementary school in the United States to base its curriculum around agriculture. Integrating agricultural components into the classroom is one of the challenges that elementary teachers face. They are also expected to teach with outdated teaching substances. John Block, who was a previous Secretary of Agriculture for the United States, encouraged agricultural competence. Agriculture in the Classroom was one of Block's achievements to stress agricultural literacy in 1981. Agriculture in the Classroom soon became utilized in each state. Though Agriculture in the Classroom was the beginning of agriculture education in all fifty states, elementary instruction began in some schools possibly before the 1900s. After elementary agriculture education began to grow, twenty-one states began to require it by 1915. The required curriculum was evenly split between urban and rural schools. The states that required agricultural education at the elementary level were all midwestern states or southern states; both of which are rich in agriculture.

=== High school ===
In the United States, intracurricular agricultural education at the high school level focuses on three main categories of student engagement: classroom/laboratory instruction, supervised agricultural experience (SAE), and active involvement in the National FFA Organization (Formerly known as the Future Farmers of America).

- Classroom instruction of an agricultural class teaches the students the basic concepts of the particular course through hands-on learning and experience. Students will be taught the information in the curriculum in order for them to understand and develop skills in the application and problem solving issues that would occur in an agricultural setting.
- The Supervised Agricultural Experience (SAE) portion of agricultural curriculum encourages the practical application of classroom knowledge. SAE activities promote the development of five core competencies: career exploration and planning, personal financial management and planning, workplace safety, employability skills for college and career readiness, and agricultural literacy and exploration. Several topic choices are available for the student to choose between, whether it is on a farm setting, exploratory setting, entrepreneurship, agribusiness, or research projects. The student will choose a task from one of these topic areas and conduct a research experiment throughout the course of the agricultural class. The teacher is involved in the process and will help guide the student along the way. SAE programs give students the opportunity to take the information learned in the classroom setting and use it on an agricultural topic that interests them. This portion of an agricultural education will give students an idea of how it is working out in the real world and solving problems that will arise in the work field.
- FFA is a national organization that all agricultural classes at the high school level are involved in. The agricultural teacher is the leader of that particular schools FFA chapter, and will guide students' activities and programs held throughout the year. FFA is an educational program designed to teach students leadership skills in both agricultural settings and everyday life, encourages personal growth in students, boosts self-confidence, builds character, encourage healthy lifestyles, and give students opportunities to be a part of the agricultural economy. FFA chapters will volunteer in communities, conduct banquets for FFA members and their families, raise awareness of agriculture, compete in FFA competitions, and attend national FFA conventions.

In some states, the agriculture teacher leads a local Young Farmers Association in monthly meetings. The group may comprise local farmers, citizens, and anyone interested in learning about agriculture and new farming methods. The Young Farmers Association is designed to aid the adoption of agricultural technologies, and it gives agriculture teachers the opportunity to meet local citizens and reach out to the community.

=== Colleges and universities ===
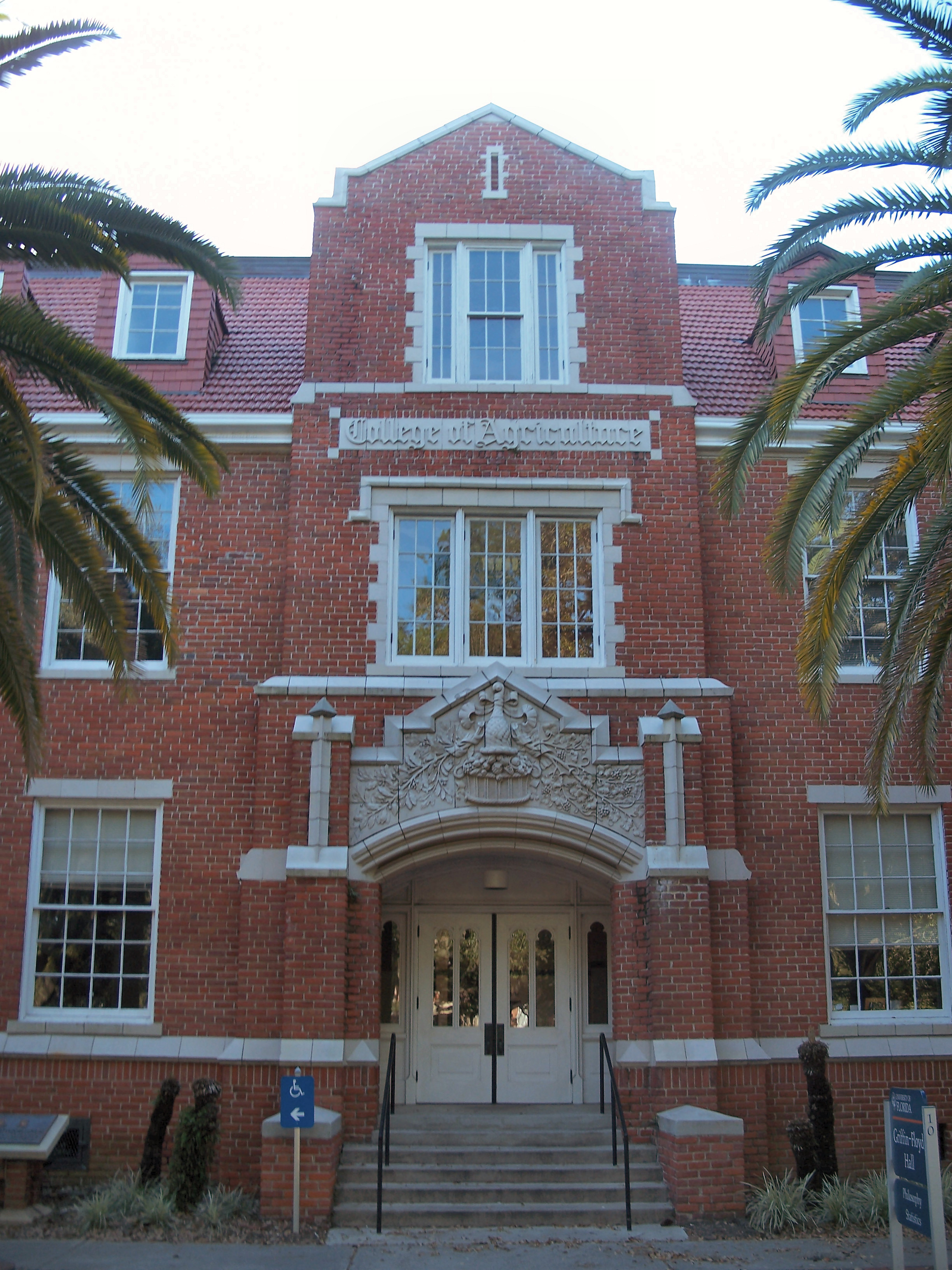
College of Agriculture at the University of Florida

Land-grant universities awarded more than three-quarters of all agricultural degrees in 1988. These state schools receive federal aid under legislation that followed the Morrill Act of 1862, which granted public lands to support agricultural or mechanical education. Land-grant universities have three chief functions: teaching, research, and outreach, or extension.

==== Teaching ====
A bachelor's degree in agricultural education generally leads to employment teaching agriculture up to the high school level or in the agricultural sector. Students are required to complete agriculture classes as well as education classes in order to become qualified to teach. A master's degree is required in order to teach at the college level. The Association for Career and Technical Education (ACTE), the largest national education association dedicated to the advancement of education that prepares youth and adults for careers, provides resources for agricultural education. An agricultural education degree also gives the qualifications to do extension work for universities and agricultural companies and organizations.

The following universities provide pathways to complete certification requirements of their home states in secondary agricultural education:

- Alcorn State University
- Angelo State University - Texas
- Auburn University
- Clemson University
- Cornell University
- Colorado State University, Degree Requirements
- Illinois State University, Degree Requirements
- Louisiana State University
- Delaware Valley University
- Michigan State University,
- Middle Tennessee State University
- Montana State University
- North Carolina State University
- North Dakota State University
- Oregon State University
- Oklahoma State University
- The Pennsylvania State University, Degree Requirements
- South Dakota State University, Degree Requirements
- The University of Idaho
- Sam Houston State University - Texas
- Sul Ross State University - Texas
- Texas A & M - Kingsville
- Texas A & M - Commerce
- Texas A&M University
- Texas State University
- Texas Tech University
- Tarleton State University -Texas
- University of Arkansas
- University of Georgia
- University of Missouri, Degree Requirements
- Utah State University
- Washington State University
- West Virginia University
- West Texas A & M - Texas

Colleges of agriculture additionally prepare students for careers in all aspects of the food and agricultural system. Some career choices include food science, veterinary science, farming, ranching, teaching, marketing, agricultural communication, rural sociology, management, and social services. Colleges and universities awarded about 21,000 bachelor's degrees in agriculture per year in 1988, and about 6,000 master's or doctor's degrees.

==== Research ====
Each land-grant university has an agricultural experiment station equipped with laboratories and experimental farms. There, agricultural scientists work to develop better farming methods, solve the special problems of local farmers, and provide new technology. Research published in scholarly journals about agricultural safety is available from the NIOSH-supported National Agricultural Safety Database. The American Dairy Science Association provides research and education scholarships focused on the dairy farm and processing industries.

==== Extension service ====
The Cooperative Extension System is a partnership of the federal, state, and county governments. This service distributes information gathered by the land-grant universities and the U.S. Department of Agriculture to farmers, families, and young people. County extension agents, located in most countries (1988), train and support about 3 million (1988) volunteer leaders. Agents and volunteers carry out extension programs through meetings, workshops, newsletters, radio, television, and visits.

=== Professional agricultural education organizations ===
Multiple professional organizations operate in the United States to provide networking and professional development opportunities for agricultural professionals.

- The American Association for Agricultural Educators (AAAE) was founded in 1930 for professionals in agricultural education. The mission of AAAE is "to foster excellence in the discovery and exchange of evidence-based solutions for social science challenges in agriculture and related sciences."
- The Association for Career and Technical Education (ACTE) supports professionals in career and technical education. ACTE promotes professional development opportunities and strives to increase the visibility and quality of career and technical education nationwide. The organization's stated mission is to "provide educational leadership in developing a competitive workforce."
- The National Association of Agricultural Educators (NAAE) is a non-profit organization created in 1948 to provide national leadership in agricultural education. It has over 7,800 members who are involved in school-based agricultural education.

=== Youth agricultural education organizations ===
==== 4-H ====
The 4-H Club is a youth development program that teaches children about science, leadership, research, and more. 4-H has over six million members nationwide and is the largest youth development organization in the United States. 4-H members use hands-on learning to reach goals and serve communities. Members of 4-H carry out group and individual projects dealing with conservation, food and agriculture, health and safety, and other subjects. The 4-H program in the United States is part of the Cooperative Extension service.

==== FFA ====
Somewhat similarly, the FFA is a national organization that teaches students leadership skills and is designed to help members become more well rounded citizens in the agricultural field. The FFA is an integral part of the program of agricultural education in many high schools as a result of Public Law 740 in 1950 (Currently revised as Public Law 105-225 of the 105th Congress of the United States), with 649,355 FFA members (2016–2017). Local chapters participate in Career Development Events (individually and as a team), each student has a Supervised Agricultural Experience program (SAE), and participates in many conferences and conventions to develop leadership, citizenship, patriotism and excellence in agriculture. The National FFA Organization is structured from the local chapter up, including local districts, areas, regions, state associations, and the national level. The FFA Mission is to make a positive difference in the lives of students by developing their potential for premier leadership, personal growth, and career success through agricultural education.

== Outside the US ==
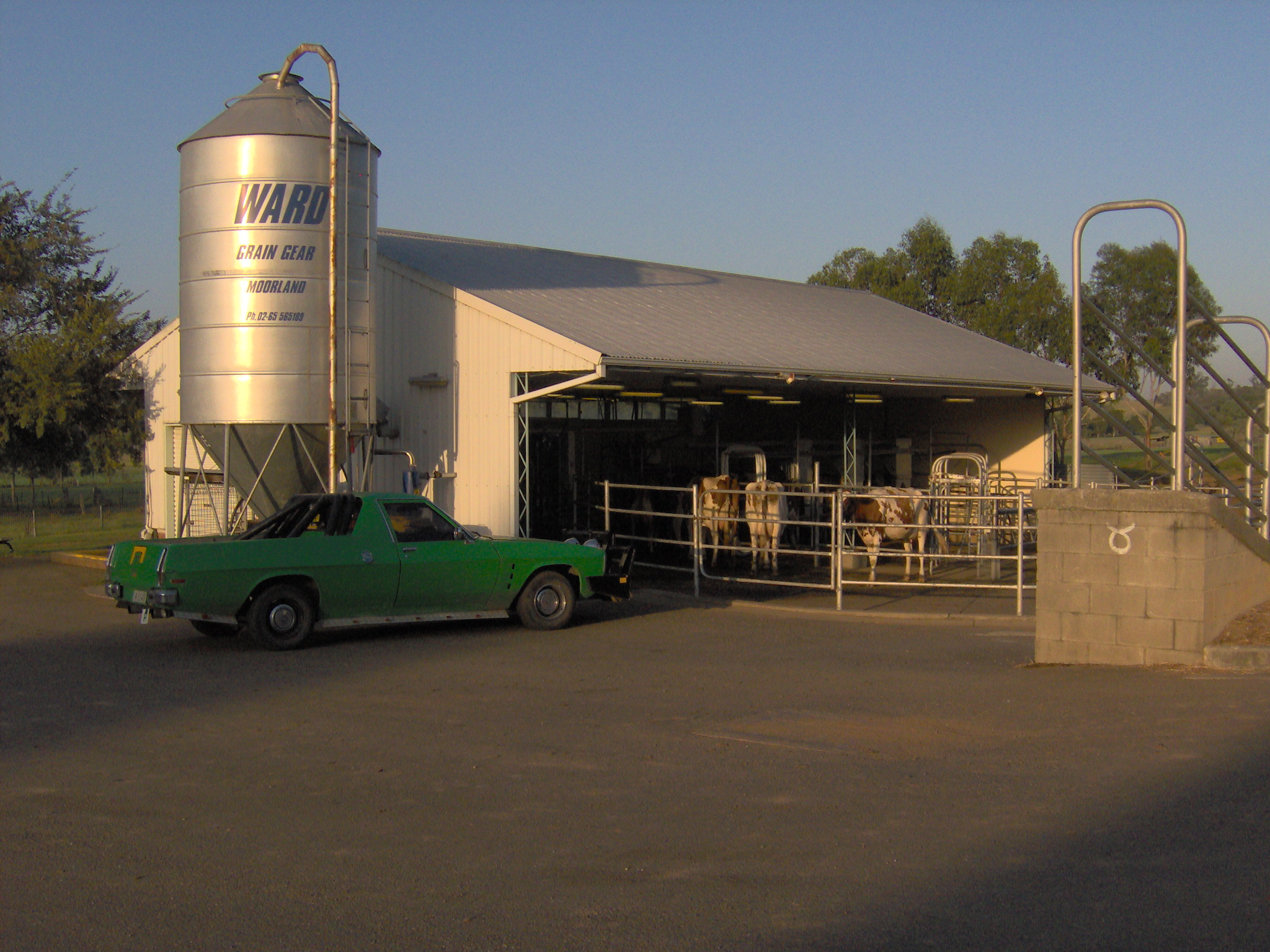
Hurlstone Agricultural High School in Australia maintains a dairy with 42 head of cattle.

The history of agricultural education predates US activities and initially developed in Scottish, Italian, and German colleges. The land grant approach of the United States owes much to the Scottish system in particular. Changes in higher agricultural education around the world today are highlighting implicit approaches that have hampered development and exceptional advances that have fed the world. The process has been described in one text (below) which takes a global perspective.

Agricultural education in other countries resembles that in the United States. Canada has its own 4-H program. Agriculture Canada distributes information on new farming methods and maintains experimental farms, research stations, and research institutions throughout the country. The BC Agriculture in the Classroom Foundation operates in the province of British Columbia. In Australia, each state has several agricultural research stations and an extension service. Great Britain has a program of youth clubs called Young Farmer's Clubs that resemble 4-H. The Food and Agriculture Organization of the United Nations works to train people throughout the world in modern farming methods. The United States gives technical assistance to farmers in developing nations through its Agency for International Development (AID).

The Green School Alliance (GSA) founded in 2007, has been working globally to expand its network of peer-to-peer Green Schools, which focus on teaching sustainability and environmental education. It is a non-profit organization with free and voluntary membership. It has accrued 8,087 member schools from 48 states and 91 countries.

=== Australia ===
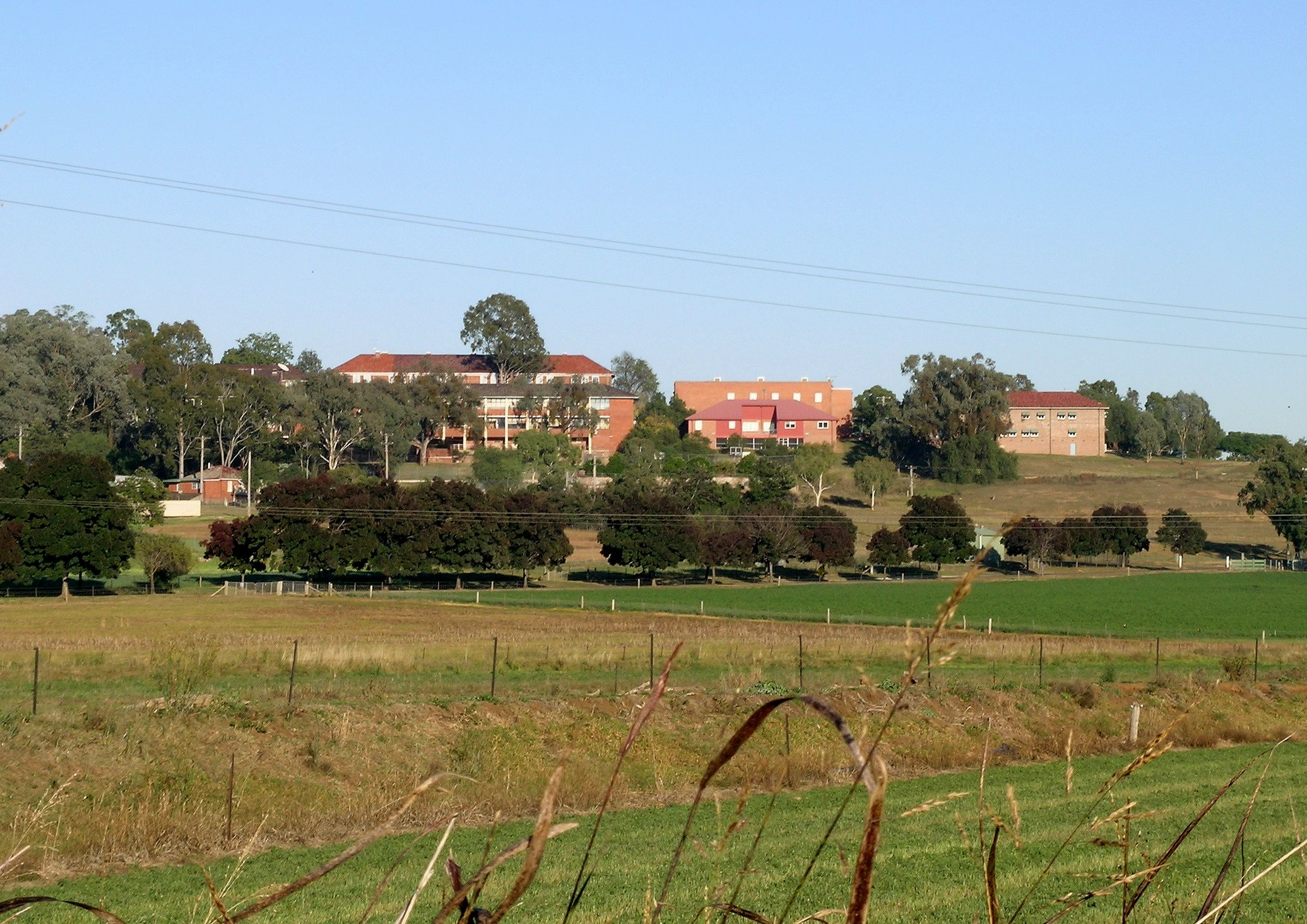
Farrer Memorial Agricultural High School

As of February 2015, agriculture in Australia employs over 235,300 people in the agriculture, fishing, and forestry industries. This industry alone accounts for a 12% share of the GDP, earning close to $155 billion a year. The farmers own a combined 135,997 farms, covering approximately 61% of the land mass.

Given these figures, the agricultural programs in schools and universities are very important to the future of the country. Several high schools across the country specialize in agricultural education. These high schools are predominantly located in rural areas with access to land. In many cases, the students travel up to 1,000 km to attend these schools, residing at the schools as boarders for the school term. One of the largest in Australia is Farrer Memorial Agricultural High School in central New South Wales.

The Agriculture in Education program, launched by the Australian government in 2015, helps teachers better understand the products and processes associated with food and fibre production. It gives students an opportunity to understand the importance of agriculture in the Australian economy. Topics covered in the program include: designing and making a financial plan for a market garden, free range chicken farming, food security, and sustainable production practices in food and fibre. The agricultural environment has changed significantly over the past 15 years, with greater emphasis on product quality issues, vertical integration from production to consumer, diversity in demand options, and addressing environmental issues – namely drought, welfare, and ethical issues.

==== Western Australia ====
In Western Australia, the Western Australian College of Agriculture is the primary provider of high schools in the state, providing educational opportunities at six campuses located near Cunderdin, Denmark, Esperance, Harvey, Morawa and Narrogin. Each campus has modern facilities on commercial-sized farms and offers Year 10, 11, and 12 programs for male and female students. The students study a range of School Curriculum and Standards Authority subjects leading to Secondary Graduation and the Western Australian Certificate of Education, and also complete vocational qualifications from Industry Training Packages. The major focus is on the study of agriculture, but the program may also include horticulture, viticulture, equine, aquaculture, forestry, building construction, metals and engineering, and automotive. Each campus offers some specialist programs that can lead to tertiary study, apprenticeships, and careers in a range of agriculture-related vocations. Tertiary studies located in Perth are available at Curtin University, Murdoch University, and Muresk Institute, offering degrees in Agriculture including Agricultural Business Management and Agricultural Science.

Western Australia is in a precarious position and faces several challenges, a fact highlighting that agriculture in Australia is affected by an ongoing shortage of labour and of skills. Labour supply is being adversely affected by an aging workforce, retirements by baby boomers, the seasonal nature of the lower-skilled workforce, and an inability to attract sufficient young people to work in the industry.

== Agricultural educators ==
- Otto Frederick Hunziker, Purdue University
- John Wrightson, Downton Agricultural College
- Raymond A. Pearson, Cornell University
- HAS University of Applied Sciences
- Kasetsart University
- King Mongkut's Institute of Technology Ladkrabang
- Wageningen University

== See also ==
- Agricultural engineering
- Agricultural extension
- Agricultural science
- Farmworld
- Holistic Management International
- Land economy
- List of agricultural universities and colleges
- Texas FFA Association
