= List of United Kingdom locations: Wa-Wal =

The United Kingdom

This is part of the list of United Kingdom locations: a gazetteer of place names in the United Kingdom showing each place's locality and geographical coordinates.

== Wa ==
=== Waa-Wak ===
Location	Locality	Coordinates (links to map & photo sources)	OS grid reference
Wackerfield	Durham	54.59°N 01.76°W	NZ1522
Wacton	Norfolk	52.47°N 01.19°E	TM1791
Wacton	Herefordshire	52.21°N 02.57°W	SO6157
Wacton Common	Norfolk	52.45°N 01.20°E	TM1889
Wadbister	Shetland Islands	60.22°N 01.22°W	HU4349
Wadborough	Worcestershire	52.12°N 02.14°W	SO9047
Wadbrook	Devon	50.80°N 02.96°W	ST3201
Waddesdon	Buckinghamshire	51.83°N 00.92°W	SP7416
Waddeton	Devon	50.39°N 03.59°W	SX8756
Waddicar	Sefton	53.48°N 02.92°W	SJ3999
Waddicombe	Devon	51.03°N 03.62°W	SS8627
Waddingham	Lincolnshire	53.45°N 00.52°W	SK9896
Waddington	Lancashire	53.88°N 02.42°W	SD7243
Waddington	Lincolnshire	53.16°N 00.53°W	SK9864
Waddingworth	Lincolnshire	53.22°N 00.23°W	TF1871
Waddon	Devon	50.60°N 03.58°W	SX8879
Waddon	Croydon	51.36°N 00.11°W	TQ3164
Wadebridge	Cornwall	50.51°N 04.85°W	SW9872
Wadeford	Somerset	50.88°N 02.99°W	ST3010
Wade Hall	Lancashire	53.68°N 02.72°W	SD5221
Wadenhoe	Northamptonshire	52.43°N 00.51°W	TL0183
Wades Green	Cheshire	53.13°N 02.52°W	SJ6560
Wadesmill	Hertfordshire	51.83°N 00.04°W	TL3517
Wadhurst	East Sussex	51.05°N 00.33°E	TQ6431
Wadshelf	Derbyshire	53.22°N 01.53°W	SK3170
Wadsley	Sheffield	53.40°N 01.53°W	SK3190
Wadsley Bridge	Sheffield	53.41°N 01.50°W	SK3391
Wadswick	Wiltshire	51.40°N 02.23°W	ST8467
Wadwick	Hampshire	51.27°N 01.38°W	SU4353
Wadworth	Doncaster	53.46°N 01.15°W	SK5697
Waen (Llansantffraid)	Powys	52.76°N 03.14°W	SJ2319
Trefeglwys (Trefeglwys)	Powys	52.50°N 03.54°W	SN9591
Waen	Flintshire	53.24°N 03.27°W	SJ1573
Waen (Llandyrnog)	Denbighshire	53.17°N 03.34°W	SJ1065
Waen (Nantglyn)	Denbighshire	53.14°N 03.51°W	SH9962
Waen Aberwheeler	Denbighshire	53.21°N 03.36°W	SJ0969
Waen-fach	Powys	52.74°N 03.18°W	SJ2017
Waen-pentir	Gwynedd	53.17°N 04.14°W	SH5766
Waen-wen	Gwynedd	53.19°N 04.14°W	SH5768
Wagbeach	Shropshire	52.61°N 02.94°W	SJ3602
Wagg	Somerset	51.03°N 02.81°W	ST4326
Waggersley	Staffordshire	52.93°N 02.19°W	SJ8737
Waggs Plot	Devon	50.80°N 02.98°W	ST3101
Wainfelin	Torfaen	51.70°N 03.05°W	SO2701
Wainfleet All Saints	Lincolnshire	53.10°N 00.22°E	TF4959
Wainfleet Bank	Lincolnshire	53.10°N 00.19°E	TF4759
Wainfleet St Mary	Lincolnshire	53.09°N 00.22°E	TF4958
Wainfleet Tofts	Lincolnshire	53.09°N 00.20°E	TF4857
Wainford	Norfolk	52.45°N 01.44°E	TM3490
Waingroves	Derbyshire	53.03°N 01.38°W	SK4149
Wainhouse Corner	Cornwall	50.72°N 04.58°W	SX1895
Wain Lee	Staffordshire	53.09°N 02.21°W	SJ8655
Wainscott	Kent	51.41°N 00.50°E	TQ7471
Wainstalls	Calderdale	53.74°N 01.94°W	SE0428
Waitby	Cumbria	54.46°N 02.38°W	NY7508
Waithe	Lincolnshire	53.48°N 00.07°W	TA2800
Wakefield	West Yorkshire	53.67°N 01.50°W	SE3320
Wake Green	Birmingham	52.43°N 01.88°W	SP0882
Wake Hill	North Yorkshire	54.12°N 01.71°W	SE1970
Wakeley	Hertfordshire	51.91°N 00.05°W	TL3426
Wakerley	Northamptonshire	52.58°N 00.59°W	SP9599
Wakes Colne	Essex	51.91°N 00.74°E	TL8928
Wakes Colne Green	Essex	51.93°N 00.74°E	TL8930

=== Wal ===
==== Wala-Walh ====
Location	Locality	Coordinates (links to map & photo sources)	OS grid reference
Walberton	West Sussex	50.84°N 00.63°W	SU9606
Walbottle	Newcastle upon Tyne	54.98°N 01.73°W	NZ1766
Walby	Cumbria	54.93°N 02.89°W	NY4360
Walcombe	Somerset	51.22°N 02.64°W	ST5547
Walcot	Bath and North East Somerset	51.38°N 02.36°W	ST7565
Walcot	Lincolnshire	52.90°N 00.42°W	TF0635
Walcot	North Lincolnshire	53.67°N 00.66°W	SE8821
Walcot	Oxfordshire	51.86°N 01.50°W	SP3419
Walcot	Shropshire	52.69°N 02.60°W	SJ5911
Walcot	Swindon	51.55°N 01.77°W	SU1684
Walcot	Worcestershire	52.13°N 02.08°W	SO9448
Walcote	Leicestershire	52.44°N 01.17°W	SP5683
Walcote	Warwickshire	52.22°N 01.82°W	SP1258
Walcot Green	Norfolk	52.37°N 01.11°E	TM1280
Walcott	Lincolnshire	53.08°N 00.31°W	TF1356
Walcott	Norfolk	52.83°N 01.50°E	TG3632
Walden	North Yorkshire	54.23°N 01.98°W	SE0182
Walden Head	North Yorkshire	54.22°N 02.02°W	SD9880
Walden Stubbs	Doncaster	53.63°N 01.16°W	SE5516
Waldershaigh	Sheffield	53.46°N 01.60°W	SK2696
Walderslade	Kent	51.33°N 00.51°E	TQ7562
Walderton	West Sussex	50.88°N 00.89°W	SU7810
Walditch	Dorset	50.72°N 02.73°W	SY4892
Waldley	Derbyshire	52.92°N 01.82°W	SK1236
Waldridge	Durham	54.84°N 01.61°W	NZ2550
Waldringfield	Suffolk	52.04°N 01.32°E	TM2844
Waldringfield Heath	Suffolk	52.04°N 01.29°E	TM2644
Waldron	East Sussex	50.95°N 00.19°E	TQ5419
Waldron Down	East Sussex	50.96°N 00.17°E	TQ5321
Wales	Somerset	51.01°N 02.60°W	ST5824
Wales	Rotherham	53.33°N 01.29°W	SK4782
Wales Bar	Rotherham	53.34°N 01.31°W	SK4683
Walesby	Lincolnshire	53.41°N 00.30°W	TF1392
Walesby	Nottinghamshire	53.22°N 00.98°W	SK6870
Walesby Grange	Lincolnshire	53.39°N 00.33°W	TF1190
Wales End	Suffolk	52.11°N 00.61°E	TL7949
Waleswood	Rotherham	53.34°N 01.32°W	SK4583
Walford (Ross-on-Wye)	Herefordshire	51.87°N 02.61°W	SO586204
Walford (Leintwardine)	Herefordshire	52.34°N 02.89°W	SO392726
Walford	Shropshire	52.77°N 02.84°W	SJ4320
Walford	Somerset	51.04°N 03.04°W	ST2728
Walford	Staffordshire	52.89°N 02.28°W	SJ8133
Walford Heath	Shropshire	52.76°N 02.81°W	SJ4519
Walgherton	Cheshire	53.02°N 02.46°W	SJ6948
Walgrave	Northamptonshire	52.34°N 00.82°W	SP8072
Walham	Gloucestershire	51.87°N 02.26°W	SO8220
Walham Green	Hammersmith and Fulham	51.47°N 00.20°W	TQ2577
Walhampton	Hampshire	50.75°N 01.53°W	SZ3395

==== Walk-Walr ====
Location	Locality	Coordinates (links to map & photo sources)	OS grid reference
Walkden	Salford	53.52°N 02.40°W	SD7303
Walker	Newcastle upon Tyne	54.97°N 01.54°W	NZ2964
Walker Barn	Cheshire	53.25°N 02.07°W	SJ9573
Walkerburn	Scottish Borders	55.62°N 03.01°W	NT3637
Walker Fold	Lancashire	53.86°N 02.50°W	SD6741
Walkeringham	Nottinghamshire	53.41°N 00.85°W	SK7692
Walkerith	Lincolnshire	53.41°N 00.82°W	SK7892
Walkern	Hertfordshire	51.91°N 00.12°W	TL2926
Walker's Green	Herefordshire	52.11°N 02.70°W	SO5247
Walker's Heath	Birmingham	52.40°N 01.92°W	SP0578
Walkerville	North Yorkshire	54.37°N 01.69°W	SE2098
Walkford	Dorset	50.74°N 01.70°W	SZ2194
Walkhampton	Devon	50.50°N 04.07°W	SX5369
Walkington	East Riding of Yorkshire	53.82°N 00.49°W	SE9937
Walkley	Sheffield	53.38°N 01.50°W	SK3388
Walkmill	Shropshire	52.52°N 02.93°W	SO3792
Walk Mill	Lancashire	53.76°N 02.21°W	SD8630
Walkmills	Shropshire	52.58°N 02.79°W	SO4699
Wall	Cornwall	50.17°N 05.36°W	SW6036
Wall	Northumberland	55.00°N 02.14°W	NY9168
Wall	Staffordshire	52.65°N 01.86°W	SK0906
Wallacestone	Falkirk	55.97°N 03.74°W	NS9177
Wallaceton	Dumfries and Galloway	55.16°N 03.82°W	NX8487
Wallacetown (Ayr)	South Ayrshire	55.46°N 04.62°W	NS3422
Wallacetown (Water of Girvan)	South Ayrshire	55.28°N 04.72°W	NS2702
Wallacewell	Glasgow	55.884°N 04.206°W	NS621678
Wallands Park	East Sussex	50.87°N 00.01°W	TQ4010
Wallasea Island	Essex	51.60°N 00.83°E	TQ964939
Wallasey	Wirral	53.42°N 03.05°W	SJ3092
Wall Bank	Shropshire	52.52°N 02.73°W	SO5092
Wallbank	Rochdale	53.64°N 02.19°W	SD8717
Wallbrook	Dudley	52.53°N 02.08°W	SO9493
Wallcrouch	East Sussex	51.04°N 00.36°E	TQ6630
Wallend	Newham	51.52°N 00.06°E	TQ4383
Wall End	Kent	51.32°N 01.19°E	TR2363
Wall End	Cumbria	54.23°N 03.18°W	SD2383
Waller's Green	Herefordshire	52.04°N 02.48°W	SO6739
Walley's Green	Cheshire	53.14°N 02.47°W	SJ6861
Wall Heath	Dudley	52.49°N 02.19°W	SO8789
Wall Hill	Oldham	53.55°N 02.04°W	SD9706
Wallingford	Oxfordshire	51.59°N 01.13°W	SU6089
Wallington	Hampshire	50.85°N 01.17°W	SU5806
Wallington	Hertfordshire	51.98°N 00.12°W	TL2933
Wallington	Sutton	51.36°N 00.14°W	TQ2964
Wallington Heath	Walsall	52.61°N 02.01°W	SJ9902
Wallingwells	Nottinghamshire	53.35°N 01.14°W	SK5784
Wallisdown	Poole	50.73°N 01.93°W	SZ0593
Walliswood	Surrey	51.13°N 00.41°W	TQ1138
Wall Mead	Bath and North East Somerset	51.32°N 02.47°W	ST6759
Wall Nook	Durham	54.79°N 01.67°W	NZ2145
Wallow Green	Gloucestershire	51.68°N 02.24°W	ST8398
Wallridge	Northumberland	55.07°N 01.92°W	NZ0576
Walls	Shetland Islands	60.22°N 01.56°W	HU2449
Wallsend	Newcastle upon Tyne	54.98°N 01.54°W	NZ2966
Wallston	The Vale Of Glamorgan	51.44°N 03.26°W	ST1273
Wallsuches	Bolton	53.59°N 02.53°W	SD6511
Wallsworth	Gloucestershire	51.90°N 02.23°W	SO8423
Wall under Heywood	Shropshire	52.52°N 02.73°W	SO5092
Wallyford	East Lothian	55.93°N 03.02°W	NT3672
Walmer	Kent	51.20°N 01.39°E	TR3750
Walmer Bridge	Lancashire	53.71°N 02.80°W	SD4724
Walmersley	Bury	53.61°N 02.30°W	SD8013
Walmgate Stray	York	53.94°N 01.07°W	SE6150
Walmley	Birmingham	52.53°N 01.80°W	SP1393
Walmsgate	Lincolnshire	53.28°N 00.03°E	TF3678
Walney Island	Cumbria	54.08°N 03.24°W	SD189662
Walnut Grove	Perth and Kinross	56.38°N 03.41°W	NO1322
Walnut Tree	Milton Keynes	52.01°N 00.70°W	SP8936
Walnuttree Green	Hertfordshire	51.88°N 00.10°E	TL4523
Walpole	Somerset	51.16°N 03.00°W	ST3041
Walpole	Suffolk	52.31°N 01.46°E	TM3674
Walpole Cross Keys	Norfolk	52.74°N 00.23°E	TF5119
Walpole Highway	Norfolk	52.69°N 00.23°E	TF5113
Walpole Marsh	Norfolk	52.73°N 00.19°E	TF4817
Walpole St Andrew	Norfolk	52.73°N 00.22°E	TF5017
Walpole St Peter	Norfolk	52.72°N 00.21°E	TF5016
Walrow	Somerset	51.21°N 02.96°W	ST3347

==== Wals-Walz ====
Location	Locality	Coordinates (links to map & photo sources)	OS grid reference
Walsall End	Solihull	52.40°N 01.70°W	SP2079
Walsall	West Midlands	52.58°N 01.98°W	SP0198
Walsall Wood	Walsall	52.62°N 01.94°W	SK0403
Walsden	Calderdale	53.69°N 02.10°W	SD9322
Walsgrave on Sowe	Coventry	52.42°N 01.44°W	SP3881
Walsham le Willows	Suffolk	52.30°N 00.93°E	TM0071
Walshaw	Bury	53.59°N 02.34°W	SD7711
Walshford	North Yorkshire	53.97°N 01.37°W	SE4153
Walsoken	Norfolk	52.66°N 00.17°E	TF4710
Walson	Monmouthshire	51.87°N 02.82°W	SO4320
Walston	South Lanarkshire	55.68°N 03.51°W	NT0545
Walsworth	Hertfordshire	51.95°N 00.26°W	TL1930
Walter's Ash	Buckinghamshire	51.67°N 00.78°W	SU8498
Walter's Green	East Sussex	51.13°N 00.15°E	TQ5140
Walterston	The Vale Of Glamorgan	51.43°N 03.35°W	ST0671
Walterstone	Herefordshire	51.91°N 02.96°W	SO3425
Waltham	Kent	51.19°N 01.00°E	TR1048
Waltham	North East Lincolnshire	53.50°N 00.10°W	TA2603
Waltham Abbey	Essex	51.68°N 00.01°W	TL3800
Waltham Chase	Hampshire	50.93°N 01.20°W	SU5615
Waltham Cross	Enfield	51.68°N 00.04°W	TL3500
Waltham on the Wolds	Leicestershire	52.81°N 00.81°W	SK8025
Waltham's Cross	Essex	51.94°N 00.45°E	TL6930
Waltham St Lawrence	Berkshire	51.48°N 00.82°W	SU8277
Walthamstow	Waltham Forest	51.58°N 00.02°W	TQ3789
Walton	Buckinghamshire	51.80°N 00.81°W	SP8213
Walton	Cambridgeshire	52.60°N 00.27°W	TF1702
Walton	Cumbria	54.96°N 02.75°W	NY5264
Walton	Derbyshire	53.21°N 01.46°W	SK3669
Walton	Leeds	53.91°N 01.33°W	SE4447
Walton	Leicestershire	52.47°N 01.13°W	SP5987
Walton	Liverpool	53.43°N 02.96°W	SJ3694
Walton	Milton Keynes	52.01°N 00.70°W	SP8936
Walton	Powys	52.22°N 03.09°W	SO2559
Walton (Onibury)	Shropshire	52.40°N 02.79°W	SO4679
Walton (Telford and Wrekin)	Shropshire	52.75°N 02.62°W	SJ5818
Walton	Somerset	51.12°N 02.77°W	ST4636
Walton (Stone)	Staffordshire	52.89°N 02.16°W	SJ8933
Walton (Ellenhall)	Staffordshire	52.84°N 02.22°W	SJ8527
Walton	Suffolk	51.96°N 01.33°E	TM2935
Walton	Wakefield	53.64°N 01.47°W	SE3517
Walton	Warwickshire	52.17°N 01.59°W	SP2853
Walton Cardiff	Gloucestershire	51.98°N 02.14°W	SO9032
Walton Court	Buckinghamshire	51.80°N 00.82°W	SP8112
Walton East	Pembrokeshire	51.87°N 04.87°W	SN0223
Walton Elm	Dorset	50.95°N 02.31°W	ST7817
Walton Grounds	Northamptonshire	52.00°N 01.27°W	SP5034
Walton Heath	Hampshire	50.87°N 01.13°W	SU6109
Walton Highway	Norfolk	52.68°N 00.20°E	TF4912
Walton in Gordano	North Somerset	51.45°N 02.83°W	ST4273
Walton-le-Dale	Lancashire	53.73°N 02.68°W	SD5527
Walton Manor	Oxfordshire	51.75°N 01.27°W	SP5007
Walton-on-Thames	Surrey	51.38°N 00.42°W	TQ1066
Walton-on-the-Hill	Surrey	51.27°N 00.25°W	TQ2254
Walton-on-the-Hill	Staffordshire	52.77°N 02.07°W	SJ9520
Walton-on-the-Naze	Essex	51.84°N 01.26°E	TM2521
Walton on the Wolds	Leicestershire	52.76°N 01.12°W	SK5919
Walton-on-Trent	Derbyshire	52.75°N 01.69°W	SK2118
Walton Pool	Worcestershire	52.40°N 02.10°W	SO9378
Walton St Mary	North Somerset	51.44°N 02.85°W	ST4172
Walton Summit	Lancashire	53.72°N 02.65°W	SD5725
Walton Warren	Norfolk	52.70°N 00.57°E	TF7415
Walton West	Pembrokeshire	51.76°N 05.10°W	SM8612
Walwen (LLanasa)	Flintshire	53.30°N 03.33°W	SJ1179
Walwen (Bagillt)	Flintshire	53.27°N 03.20°W	SJ2076
Walwen (Ysceifiog)	Flintshire	53.22°N 03.24°W	SJ1771
Walwick	Northumberland	55.02°N 02.15°W	NY9070
Walworth	Southwark	51.48°N 00.10°W	TQ3278
Walworth	Darlington	54.55°N 01.64°W	NZ2318
Walworth Gate	Darlington	54.57°N 01.64°W	NZ2320
Walwyn's Castle	Pembrokeshire	51.75°N 05.08°W	SM8711
