= Waddon (disambiguation) =

Waddon is a neighbourhood of Croydon, London.

Waddon may also refer to:

- Waddon, Devon, a location in England
- Waddon (ward), local government unit in Croydon, London
- Waddon railway station

== People with the surname ==
- Waddon (surname)

== See also ==
- Whaddon
