= Waltons =

Waltons can refer to:

- Waltons (department store), an Australian department store chain
  - Waltons Stores (Interstate) Ltd v Maher, a contracts case involving the department store
- Waltons (Canadian band)
- Residents in the Walton Well Road area of Oxford, England

== See also ==
- The Waltons (disambiguation)
- Walton (disambiguation)
