= Langdon Academy =

Location
- Sussex Road; East Ham, London, E6 2PS; England; 51°31′56″N 0°03′56″E

Information
- Type: Academy
- Established: 1 September 2012
- Trust: Brampton Manor Trust UID: 2413
- Department for Education URN: 140373 Tables
- Ofsted: Reports
- Principal: Jamie Brooks
- Gender: Mixed
- Age: 3 to 16
- Enrolment: 2078
- Website: www.langdonacademy.org

Langdon Academy (formerly known as Langdon School, and East Ham Grammar School for Boys) is a mixed all-through school with academy status, located on Sussex Road, East Ham in the London Borough of Newham, England.

It is situated in East Ham, close to the junction of the A124 (Barking Road) with the North Circular Road (A406): the school playing fields border on to the A406. This is near the eastern end terminus of the A406 with the A13 in Wallend, close to the boundary of Newham and Barking and Dagenham and Barking Creek. The River Roding runs behind the school in Barking.

== Admissions ==
Langdon Academy is a school for pupils aged 3–16, which admitted its first primary cohort in 2011. A £26 million building works programme has been completed in time for the 2013/14 academic year, in time for the appointment of Principal Chris Mallaband, who left the academy at the end of the spring term. Peter Whittle was the principal between 2014 and 2018. Now Jamie Brooks is the new principal of the academy.

== History ==
In 1905 a mixed grammar school was opened on Barking Road. East Ham Grammar School for Girls was opened on Plashet Grove in 1932, and this became Plashet School, a separate school, in 1972.

=== Second World War ===
The school was evacuated to Swindon in north Wiltshire, but had mostly returned by 1942.

=== Transfer of the site in 1952 ===
The Langdon buildings were completed in 1953 on former marshland on the eastern border of East Ham with Barking, when administered by the County Borough of East Ham. They consisted of three schools: Burges Manor (girls), Thomas Lethaby (boys) and East Ham Grammar School for Boys. The two secondary modern schools, Burgess Manor and Thomas Lethaby, had been newly formed for the site in 1950/1 but the Grammar School had previously occupied a site at East Ham Town Hall and was founded in 1905. It moved from Barking Road to Langdon Crescent in 1952.

=== Comprehensive ===
In 1972 the two secondary modern schools and the boys' grammar school amalgamated to create a large 12-form entry mixed comprehensive school. Newham created thirteen 11–18 comprehensives, later to dispose of many sixth forms in 1992 except for two faith schools. In September 1998 Langdon School was awarded sports college status by the DFES.

Former UK Prime Minister Tony Blair visited in 2005. Visitors from around the world came to visit the school because of the progress made during the headship of Ms Wiseman (1992–2009), with the school being awarded three Outstanding grades in Ofsted Inspections, the last being in 2009.

Pupils attended the Youth Debate in front of the world leaders assembled for the G8 summit in Gleneagles, Scotland. They also met the former President of South Africa Nelson Mandela at a rally in London to promote the aims of the Milleninum Goals.

=== Academy ===
The school converted to academy status on 1 January 2014 and was renamed Langdon Academy. The school is now sponsored by the Brampton Manor Academy Trust.

== Notable former pupils ==
=== East Ham Grammar School for Boys ===
- Norman Browse, president from 1992 to 1995 of the Royal College of Surgeons of England
- Ronnie Boyce, midfielder for West Ham United F.C.
- William Harold Joseph Childs FRSE, physicist
- Terrance Dicks, scriptwriter, especially for Doctor Who
- Christopher France, Permanent Secretary from 1992 to 1995 of the Ministry of Defence and from 1987 to 1992 of the Department of Health
- Derek Johnson, 800m runner who won silver at the 1956 Melbourne Olympics
- Barrie Keeffe, playwright who wrote The Long Good Friday
- Wolf Mankowitz, playwright

=== Langdon Secondary School ===
- Kane Robinson (Kano), rapper and actor
- Kele Le Roc, singer

== Former teachers ==
- Dame Joan McVittie (Deputy Head Teacher from 1996 to 1998 of Langdon School), President from 2011 to 2012 of the Association of School and College Leaders
- Vanessa Wiseman CBE (Head Teacher from 1992 to 2009 of Langdon School)
