= Whaddon =

Whaddon may refer to several places in England:

- Whaddon, Buckinghamshire
- Whaddon, Cambridgeshire
- Whaddon, Cheltenham, Gloucestershire
- Whaddon, Stroud, in Brookthorpe-with-Whaddon, Gloucestershire
- Whaddon, Wiltshire, hamlet near Trowbridge
- Whaddon, Salisbury, village near Salisbury, Wiltshire
- Whaddon Hall, country house in Whaddon, Buckinghamshire
- Whaddon House, block of flats in Knightsbridge, London

== Other uses ==
- Baron Whaddon, several people
- HMS Whaddon (L45), Royal Navy ship launched 1940

== See also ==
- Waddon (disambiguation)
- Brookthorpe-with-Whaddon, civil parish in Gloucestershire
