= Walton Primo X3 =

Smartphone model

- Brand: Walton
- Type: Smartphone
- Series: Primo
- First released: July 2014
- Availability by region: Bangladesh
- Compatible networks: 2G, 3G
- Dimensions: 145.1×70.2×5.5 mm (5.71×2.76×0.22 in)
- Weight: 128.1 g (5 oz)
- Operating system: Android v4.4.2 KitKat
- CPU: Octacore 1.7 GHz Processor
- Memory: 2 GB RAM
- Storage: 16 GB
- Removable storage: No
- Battery: Li-Po 2450 mAh
- Rear camera: 13 MP
- Front camera: 5 MP
- Display: 5 in
- Connectivity: Wi-Fi, Bluetooth, USB

The Walton Primo X3 is an Android smartphone manufactured by the Walton Group. It was introduced in July 2014.

== Features ==
- Rear Camera: 13 MP
- Front Camera: 5 MP
- Memory: 2 GB RAM
- Storage: 16 GB
- Battery: Li-Po 2450 mAh
- Size: 5 In
- Dimensions: 145.1 X 70.2 X 5.5 mm
- Weight: 128.1 g
- Operating system: Android 4.4.2 KitKat
- CPU: Octacore 1.7 GHz Processor
- Sensors: Accelerometer, Gyroscope, G-sensor, Light, Proximity, Compass
- Weight: 145 g
- Super AMOLED capacitive touchscreen
