= Walton Township =

Walton Township may refer to:

- Walton Township, Harvey County, Kansas
- Walton Township, Labette County, Kansas, in Labette County, Kansas
- Walton Township, Sumner County, Kansas, in Sumner County, Kansas
- Walton Township, Eaton County, Michigan
- Walton Township, Washington County, Missouri
