= Wolton (surname) =

Wolton or Woolton is an English toponymic surname, deriving from a place name (Woolton) in Kent or Lancashire. People with the name include:

- Althea Wolton (née Willoughby, 1904–1982), British artist
- Bert Wolton (1929 – 1990), English cricketer
- Dominique Wolton (b. 1947), French sociologist
- Douglas Wolton (1898 – 1988), British communist activist
- Georgie Wolton, (born 1934), British architect
- Thierry Wolton (born 1951), French journalist and essayist
- John Woolton (1535?–1594), Bishop of Exeter

== See also ==
- Earl of Woolton, a title in the Peerage of the United Kingdom
- Wolton (disambiguation)
