= William Harold Joseph Childs =

British physicist and academic author (1905–1983)

Prof William Harold Joseph Childs FRSE (19 January 1905 – 26 April 1983) was a British physicist and academic author.

== Life ==
He was born in Bromley-by-Bow in London on 19 January 1905, the son of William and Elizabeth Jane Childs. He was educated at East Ham Grammar School and then attended the University of London, graduating with a BSc in 1924. He continued as a postgraduate, being awarded a PhD in 1928.

He then received a position on the Davy-Faraday Research Laboratory (forming part of the Royal Institution), where he worked from 1931 to 1940.

During the Second World War, he worked in the Armaments Research Department at the Ministry of Supply and stayed in this role until demobbed in 1947.

In 1947, he received a professorship from Heriot-Watt College in Edinburgh, later Heriot-Watt University following its grant of university status by royal charter in 1966, and lectured in physics there until retirement in 1969. He was elected a Fellow of the Royal Society of Edinburgh in 1949, his proposers including Norman Feather and C T R Wilson.

He died on 26 April 1983.

== Publications ==
- Childs, William Harold Joseph (1951). Physical Constants, etc (6th ed.). London; John Wiley & Sons: New York.
- Childs, William Harold Joseph (1972). Physical constants: selected for students. Chapman and Hall. ISBN 9780412116209.

== Family ==
In 1934, he married Helen Simpson Gilchrist (d. 1984).
