= Newton USD 373 =

Public school district in Newton, Kansas

Address
- 308 E. 1st St. Newton, Kansas, 67114; United States
- Coordinates: 38°2′35″N 97°20′26″W

District information
- Type: Public
- Grades: Pre-K to 12
- Schools: 9

Other information
- Website: usd373.org

Newton USD 373 is a public unified school district headquartered in Newton, Kansas, United States. The district includes the communities of Newton, North Newton, Walton, McLain and nearby rural areas.

== Schools ==
The school district operates the following schools:

High school

- Newton High School in Newton (9-12)

Intermediate schools

- Chisholm Middle School in Newton (7-8)
- Santa Fe 5/6 Center in Newton (5-6)

Elementary

- Northridge Elementary in Newton (K-4)
- Slate Creek Elementary in Newton (K-4)
- South Breeze Elementary in Newton (K-4)
- Sunset Elementary in Newton (K-4)

Early education

- Cooper Early Education Center in Newton (Pre-K)

Former schools

- Walton Rural Life Center in Walton (K-4)

== See also ==
- List of high schools in Kansas
- List of unified school districts in Kansas
- Kansas State Department of Education
- Kansas State High School Activities Association
