= Walton Rural Life Center =

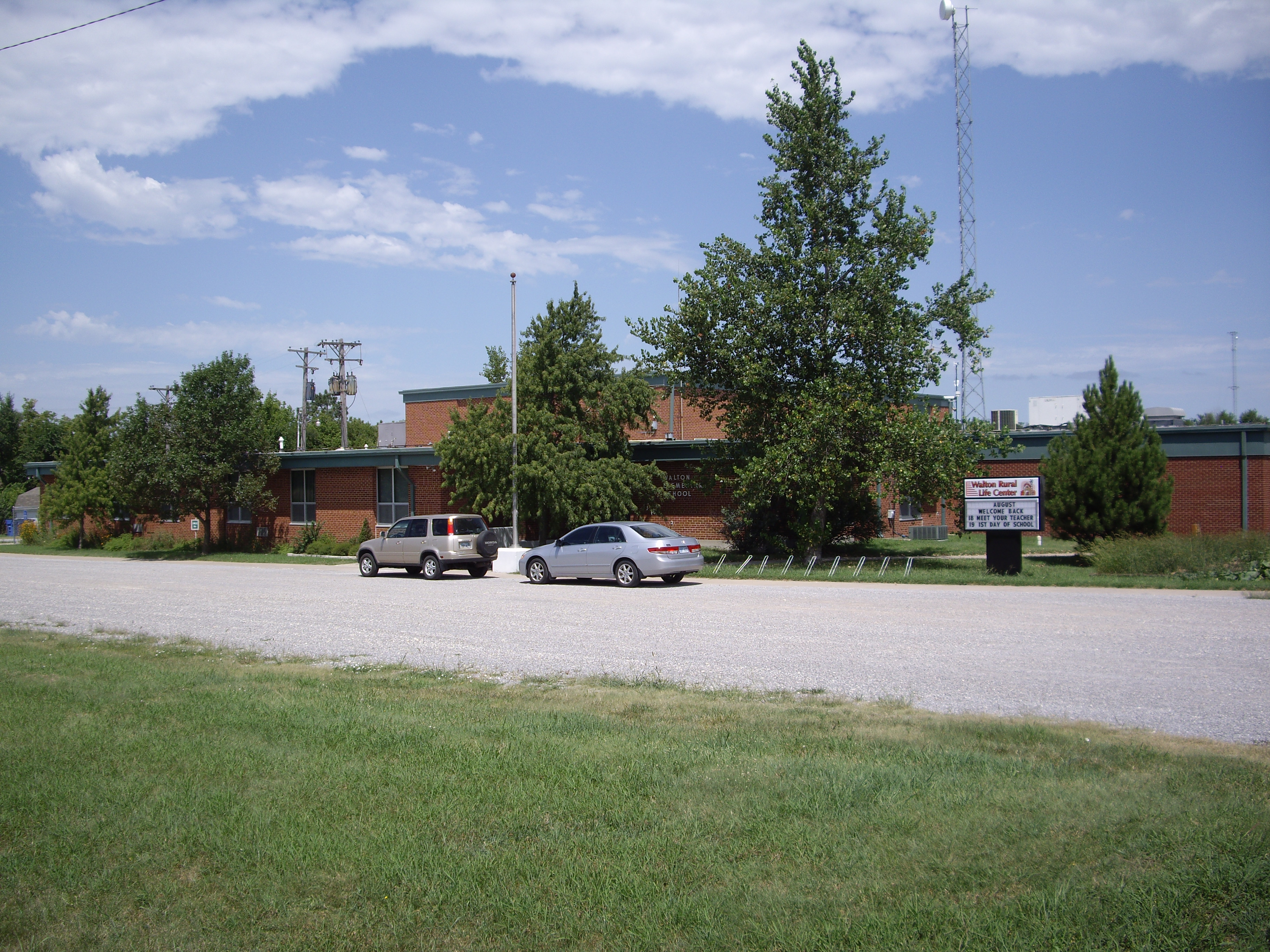
- Walton Rural Life Center (2010)

Location
- 502 West Main Street; Walton, Kansas 67151; United States
- 38°07′06″N 97°15′40″W

Information
- School type: Public, Elementary School, Charter School
- School district: Newton USD 373
- Grades: K to 4
- Gender: coed
- Enrollment: 210 (2015-2016)
- Hours in school day: 8:00AM to 3:10PM
- Campus type: Rural
- Website: w-usd373-ks.schoolloop.com

Walton Rural Life Center was an agricultural charter elementary school in Walton, Kansas, United States, and operated by Newton USD 373 public school district. During the 2015–2016 school year there were 210 students at Walton Rural Life Center. It taught students from kindergarten to 4th grade and there were two classes for each grade. In 2023 the Newton Board of Education voted to close the school due to declining enrollment in the district.

== History ==
Walton Public Schools provided elementary, junior high, and high school education for decades before it merged with Newton USD 373 public school district. In 2006, the Walton Elementary School was converted into the Walton Rural Life Center charter school.

== Academics ==
Walton Rural Life Center was one out of two charter schools that is agriculture-based, the other one being a school in Ohio. Walton Rural Life Center also taught its students about math, science, agriculture, reducing, reusing, and composting.

Walton Rural Life Center was the first public elementary school in the United States to add agriculture to its curriculum. The teachers design projects based on subjects that interest the students. Math, science, and agriculture were the main concepts studied. Instead of reading from a textbook, students experienced hands-on learning. The school had farm animals, and Kindergarten through fourth graders took turns doing chores and feeding the animals. For example, the students gathered eggs, cleaned them, and checked them for cracks. When this was all done, they sold the eggs and decided what to do with the money they earned. The school also had a greenhouse where the students grew flowers, plants, and vegetables.

== Film ==
Using Agriculture to Spur Achievement : The Walton 21st Century Rural Life Center, 2011, U.S. Department of Education filmed a documentary at the Walton 21st Century Rural Life Center charter elementary school in November 2010. The crew also interviewed farm families, teachers, students, and community members. The resulting video was featured on their website, highlighting the center as a best practices model of innovation in education.
