= Walton, Nova Scotia =

Community in Nova Scotia, Canada

Walton
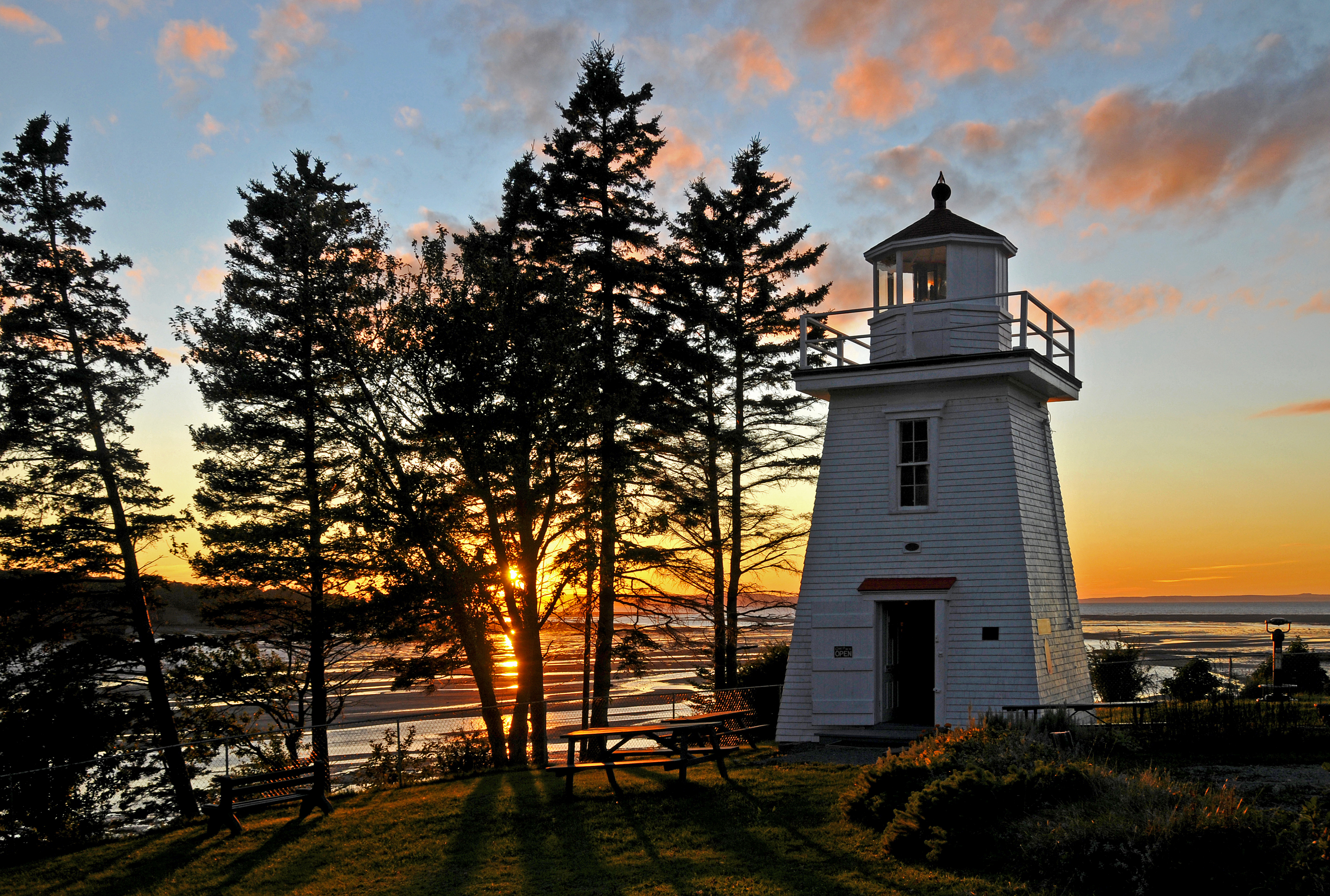
- Walton Harbour Lighthouse

- Location within Nova Scotia
- Coordinates: 45°13′47″N 64°0′23″W
- Country: Canada
- Province: Nova Scotia
- Municipality: Hants County
- Time zone: UTC-4 (AST)
- Postal code: B
- Area code: 902

Walton is a community in the Canadian province of Nova Scotia, located in the Municipal District of East Hants. The community is named after John Nutting's son James Walton Nutting (who was named after his mother Mary Walton).

== History ==
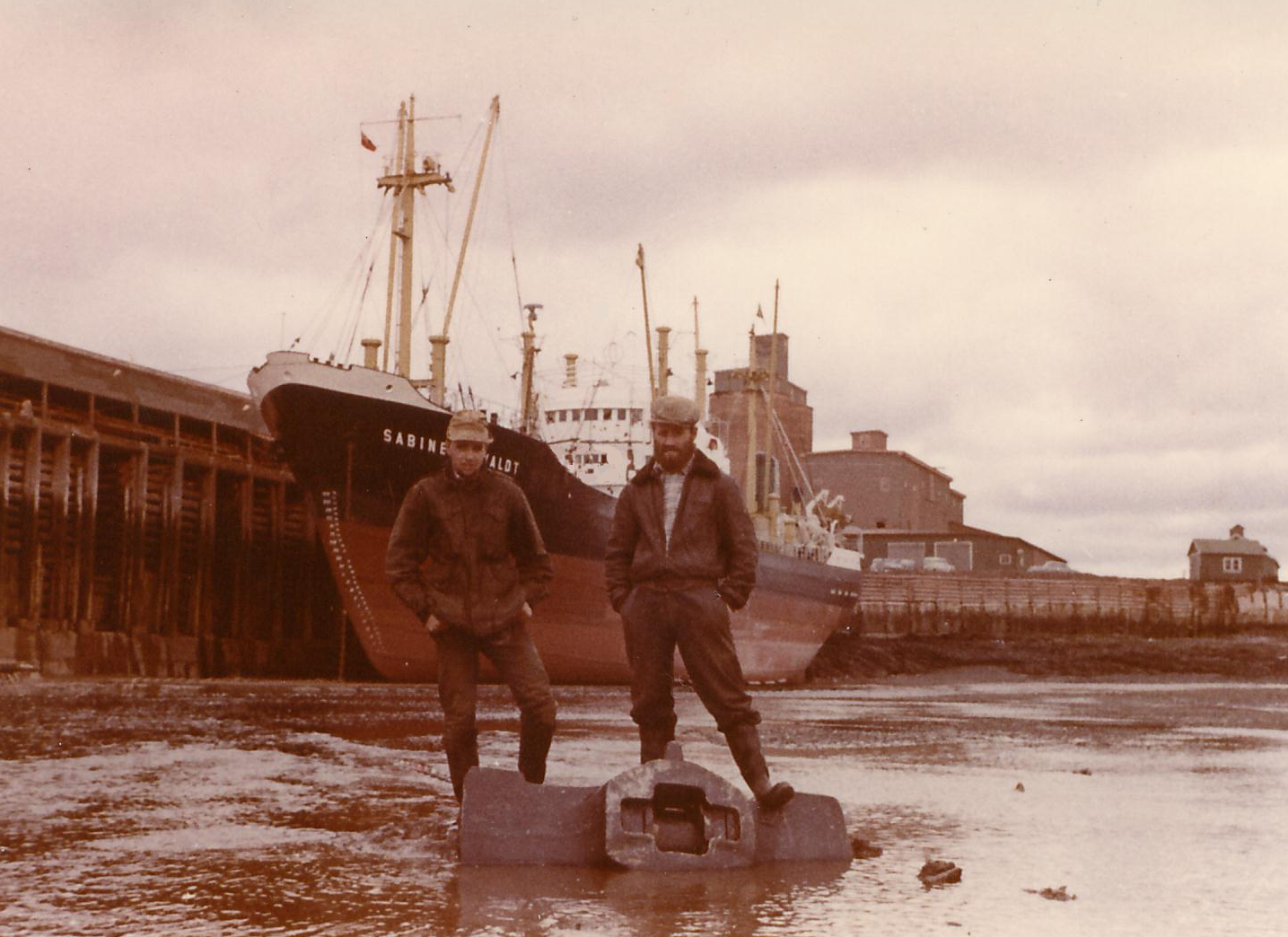
German freighter in port, 1958. The Port of Walton is no longer active.

Acadians lived in the village before the Expulsion of the Acadians. At that time the community was named Petit Rivier. The Acadians built dykes and four dwellings. When Acadians lived in the area that is now the village of Walton, the settlement was known as Petite Riviere, after the small stream that empties into Minas Basin there. Following the Expulsion of the Acadians, New England Planters and Loyalists moved in. The settlement was renamed Walton in 1836 in honour of James Walton, whose daughter and son-in-law, John and Mary Nutting, owned extensive property in the area. Francis Parker was responsible for jump starting a lot of the local industry. He opened a gypsum mine in 1820 and exported the rock from the harbour. He also built the first sawmill on Walton River in 1837, and he opened a shipyard in the harbour around 1850. Parker’s 557-tonne barque Walton, launched in 1855, was one of the largest of the more than twenty-five vessels that were built in Walton over the next thirty years. Mining, shipbuilding, and lumbering were all active industries in the harbour for many decades.

Walton Harbour Lighthouse with ship being loaded at dock In 1855, John Mosher and others petitioned the government of Nova Scotia for a lighthouse to mark the entrance to the harbour at Walton. A committee of the House of Assembly did not recommend the building of the lighthouse at that time, but two years later, a lighthouse for the port of Walton was included in a list of lighthouses to be built if there were sufficient funds. After the lighthouse ended up not being built in 1857, residents of Walton brought the matter up again in 1860. Records after that are silent, and it wouldn’t be until after Confederation that Walton would get its sought-after lighthouse. The Department of Marine published the following information on the newly completed Walton Lighthouse in its annual report for 1874:

The village was later granted to Loyalists, John Nutting, who gave the community to his son James Walton Nutting (who was named after his mother Mary Walton).

Walton became a shipbuilding centre in the 19th century. Among the large vessels built was the namesake barque Walton built in 1855. Many of the ships built in Walton were used to carry gypsum and later barite which was mined locally (see below).

The Walton lighthouse was built in 1873 and still marks its presence along the coastline. It aided ships into the port of Walton for many years until the shipping industry declined in the 1970s. Now the lighthouse is a heritage landmark of Nova Scotia and a municipal heritage site.

=== Walton barite mine ===
Located about 4 km southwest of Walton, Nova Scotia, the Walton barite mine (1941-1978) is one of the world's largest barite deposits. The mine is Canada's largest barite mine, and accounted for 90% of Canadian barite production in the 1960s. In addition to barite, the mine also contains deposits of lead, zinc, silver, and copper.

A small barite outcrop has been known since at least 1894. The outcrop was rediscovered in 1940 by Roscoe Hiltz, who brought it to the attention of Springer Sturgeon Gold Mines Ltd. The importance of the deposit was quickly realized, and the mine started producing barite in 1941. Production was initially operated by Canadian Industrial Minerals, a subsidiary of Springer Sturgeon, then leased to Magnet Cove Barium Corporation in 1955. While conducting a diamond drilling program, the Nova Scotia Department of Mines revealed a lead-zinc-silver-copper ore body beneath the large barite deposit.

In 1970, flooding was caused by a blast in one of the large fault zones. The flood water became brackish after a few months and in 1976 the mine began phase-out operations. Production ended in February 1978, leaving nearly one million tons of material underground. The mine produced over 4.3 million tonnes of barite during its 30-year life.

The original barite wharf in Walton was burned down by arson on August 9, 2012.

== Geology ==
The region around the barite deposit is underlain by sedimentary rocks of the Carboniferous Windsor Group, and marked by two major sets of faults, oriented east-west and northwest-southeast.

== Fire Department ==
A small local volunteer fire department is located in Walton, going by the name of Walton Shore Volunteer Fire Department. The fire department has hosted a "Field Day" every summer, usually at the end of July, consisting of games and a parade. Being one of very few, the fire department operates in both West and East Hants; doubling the area of service.
