= Walton Micro-Tech Corporation =

Electronic products company of Bangladesh

- Company type: Private Limited Company
- Industry: Conglomerate
- Founded: 1977
- Headquarters: Kaliakair, Bangladesh
- Area served: Worldwide
- Key people: S.M. Nurul Alam Rezvi (Chairman)
- Products: Electronics, Automobile, Telecommunication
- Number of employees: 10000+
- Parent: Walton Group
- Website: waltonbd.com

Walton Micro-Tech Corporation is situated near the Walton Hi-Tech Industries Limited’s factory at Chandra in Gazipur. It is the manufacturing, assembling and R&D plant for Walton's electronics products such as batteries, mobiles, televisions (CRT, LED), home appliances (blender, rice cooker, induction cooker, air fryer, rechargeable fan, air cooler, hair dryer, DVD players etc.), electrical appliances, LED lights, electric motor etc. Walton has one of the largest battery manufacturing units in the country. Walton mobiles are one of the most selling products of Walton Micro-Tech Corporation and also is one of the best selling mobile brands in Bangladesh. Walton produces Android smartphones and some Windows phones. Walton Primo is a series of mobile computing devices designed, manufactured and marketed by Walton Electronics. The series consists of high-end Android-powered smartphones.
