= Walton (barque) =

1855 three-masted barque

Coordinates: 44.69°N 66.82°W

History
- Name: Walton
- Owner: Parker Family (1855-1857)
- Port of registry: Windsor, Nova Scotia(1855 to 1857); Liverpool, England (1858 to 1878)
- Launched: Walton, Nova Scotia
- Completed: 1855
- Fate: Wrecked September 14, 1878 White Ledge off Grand Manan Island, New Brunswick in the Bay of Fundy en route to Saint John, New Brunswick from Carnarvon, Wales.

General characteristics
- Tonnage: 557 Gross; 521 Net
- Length: 146 ft.
- Beam: 29 ft.
- Draft: 17 ft.
- Decks: 1
- Propulsion: Sail
- Sail plan: Three-masted Barque

Walton, a three-masted barque, was built for the Parker family in Walton, Nova Scotia in 1855. Under the command of Frederick Parker (sailing for his father, Francis Walton), brother of ground-breaking Halifax/Dartmouth doctor Daniel McNeill Parker, Walton was painted by notable marine artist Michele Renault in 1857 off Livorno (Leghorn), Italy. The painting currently hangs in a private home in Dartmouth, Nova Scotia. In speaking of his uncle, Captain Frederick, family historian William Frederick Parker notes: "His voyages took him chiefly to the Indian and China seas and the Mediterranean, in the barque 'Walton.' He too, lost his life in following his profession. He was never married. His body was interred at Cardiff, Wales. (His Brother, Captain John Nutting Parker, drowned in 1868 at Liverpool, England and James Walton Parker, while commanding one of his father’s ships upon a voyage to the East, perished with the ship, which was never heard of after setting sail.)".

A half model of the Walton is stored at the Mystic Seaport museum in Connecticut. She was wrecked in fog on White Ledge off of Grand Manan Island, New Brunswick in the Bay of Fundy on September 14, 1878.
