= Wall Nook =

Village in County Durham, England

Coordinates: 54.800°N 1.666°W

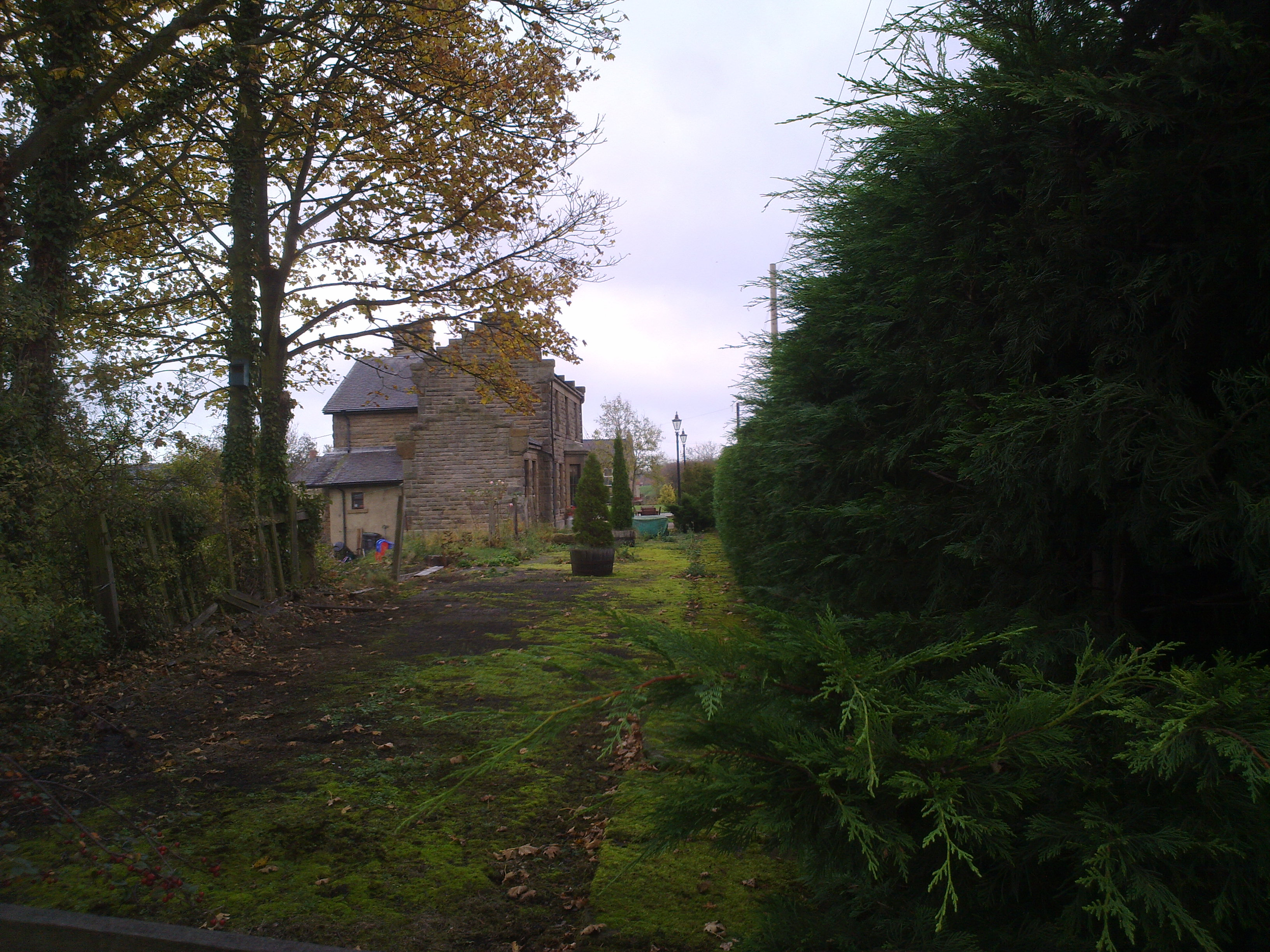

- Location within County Durham
- OS grid reference: NZ215451
- Civil parish: Esh
- Unitary authority: County Durham
- Ceremonial county: Durham
- Region: North East
- Country: England
- Sovereign state: United Kingdom
- Post town: DURHAM
- Postcode district: DH7
- Police: Durham
- Fire: County Durham and Darlington
- Ambulance: North East

Wall Nook is a hamlet in the civil parish of Esh, in County Durham, England. It is situated to the south of Langley Park, to the north west of Durham.

Wall Nook is known for its picturesque pastoral scenery in the autumn and was depicted on many nineteenth century lithographs.
