= Waltham's Cross =

Hamlet in Essex, England

Coordinates: 51.948°N 0.465°E

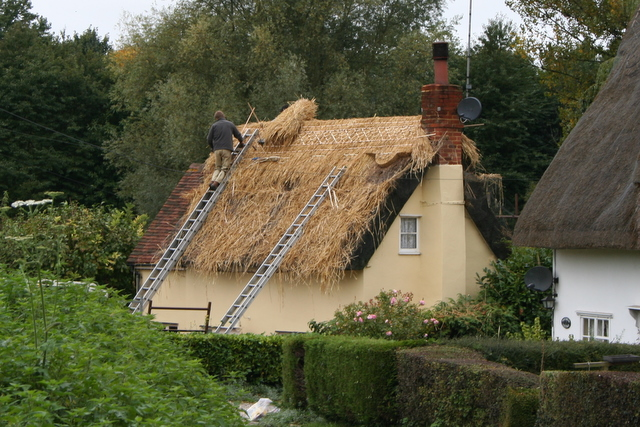

- Location within Essex
- Civil parish: Great Bardfield
- District: Braintree
- Shire county: Essex
- Region: East
- Country: England
- Sovereign state: United Kingdom
- Police: Essex
- Fire: Essex
- Ambulance: East of England

Waltham's Cross is a hamlet in the civil parish of Great Bardfield, in the Braintree district of Essex, England. It is located approximately equidistant from the villages of Finchingfield, Great Bardfield and Wethersfield.
