= Texas FFA Association =

The Texas FFA Association (Future Farmers of America) is one of fifty-two state associations of the National FFA Organization. It was the 34th state organization to be chartered, in 1929. As of the 2016–2017 year, it had the largest membership enrollment. It also has the largest number of chapters in the organization. It has 115,941 members and 1,032 chapters. The state is led by a team of 12 state officers representing each of the 12 areas of the Association.

== Leadership ==
The Texas FFA Association State Officer Team consists of twelve members to serve as officers for a year running from the state convention in July to the following convention. There are ten vice-presidents, one first vice-president, and one president. The twelve individuals make up the board of student officers. The responsibilities of an officer for the Texas FFA are to serve as a representative of the association, represent the members at the Texas FFA Board of Directors meetings, and carry out the day-to-day operations outlined in the Texas FFA Program of Activities. In order to run for state office a student must either be a graduating senior from high school, or be no more than one year removed from high school, hold the Lone Star FFA degree, and be willing to contribute many hours of service to the association.

== Texas FFA State Officers ==
=== 2026-2027 ===
President: Katelyn Krenek - Area XI, Bellville FFA

First Vice-president: Colt Nelson - Area IV, Woodson FFA

Area I Vice-president: Louden McConlogue, Canyon FFA

Area II Vice-president: Tatum Braden, Glasscock County FFA

Area III Vice-president: Trevor Shaw, Klein Cain FFA

Area V Vice-president: Austin Garza, Royse City FFA

Area VI Vice-president: Gunner Rodgers, Mt. Pleasant FFA

Area VII Vice-president: Kate Nash, Davenport FFA

Area VIII Vice-president: John Yarbrough, Midlothian FFA

Area IX Vice-president: Logan Tucker, Huntington FFA

Area X Vice-president: Milam Henry, Calallen FFA

Area XII Vice-president: Joshua Burdick, Vista Ridge FFA

== Texas FFA State Staff ==
- Jennifer Jackson, Executive Director
- Mary Edwards, Membership Services Coordinator/Assistant to the Executive Director
- Tammy Glascock, SAE Coordinator/Swine Validation Coordinator
- Carolee Frampton, Budget and Finance Coordinator
- Ashley Dunkerley, Communications Coordinator
- Bre Fowler, Competitive Events and Recognition Coordinator
- Ashlee Laird, Student Recognition and Scholarship Coordinator
- Michelle Pieniazek, Outreach and Events Coordinator
