= Walton Motors =

Motorcycle manufacturer company of Bangladesh

Walton Hi-Tech Industries Limited
- Company type: Private Limited Company
- Industry: Automotive
- Founded: 2008
- Headquarters: Chandra, Kaliakoir, Gazipur, Bangladesh
- Area served: Worldwide
- Key people: S.M. Nurul Alam Rezvi (Chairman)
- Products: Motorcycles
- Website: Walton Motorcycle

Walton Motors is a Bangladeshi motorcycle manufacturer established in 1977 as a subsidiary of Walton Group. Its products are chiefly motorcycles with displacements ranging from 80cc to 150cc.
