= Walton, Kansas =

City in Harvey County, Kansas

- City
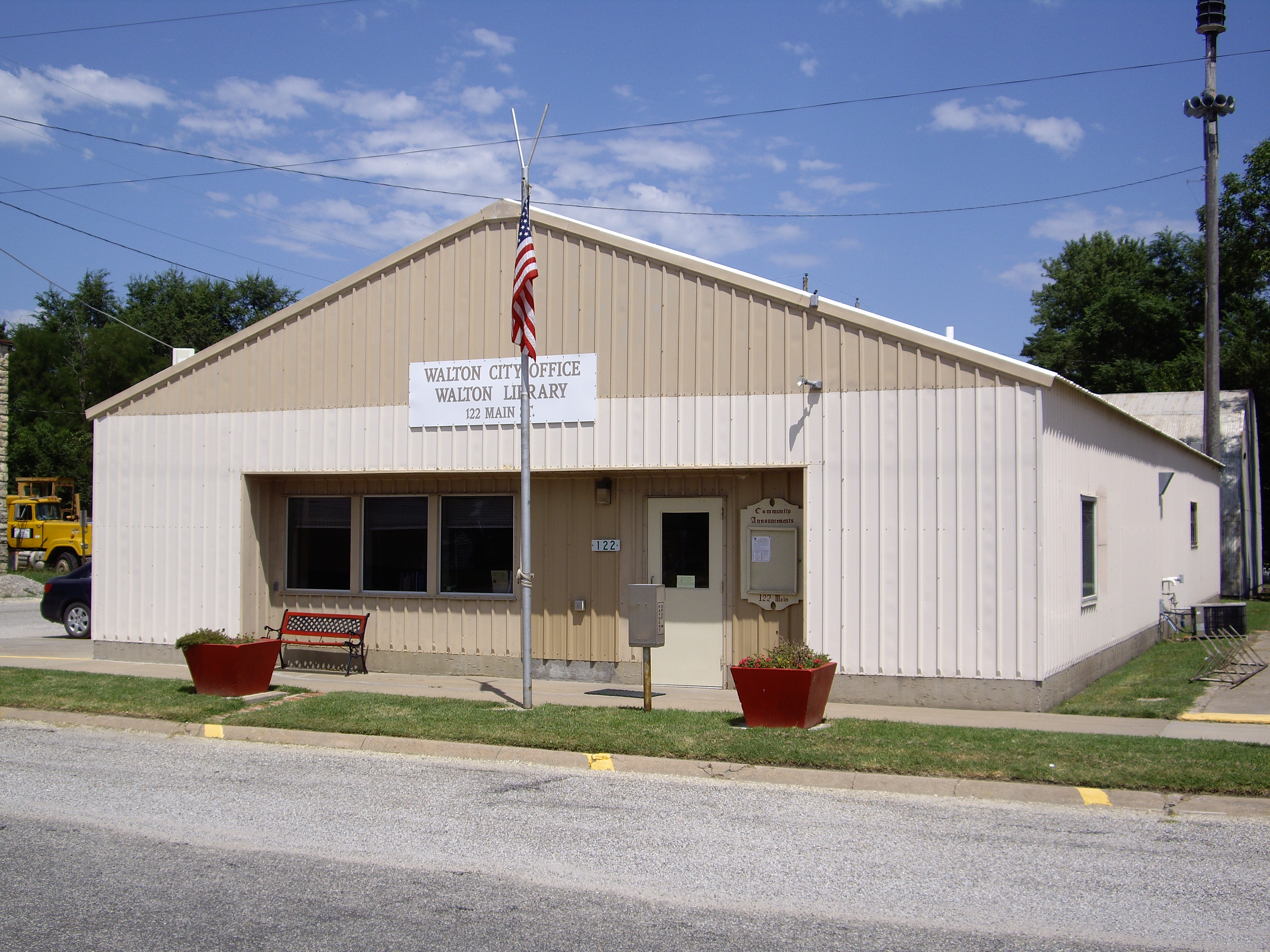
- Walton City Hall at 122 E Main St (2010)

- Location within Harvey County and Kansas

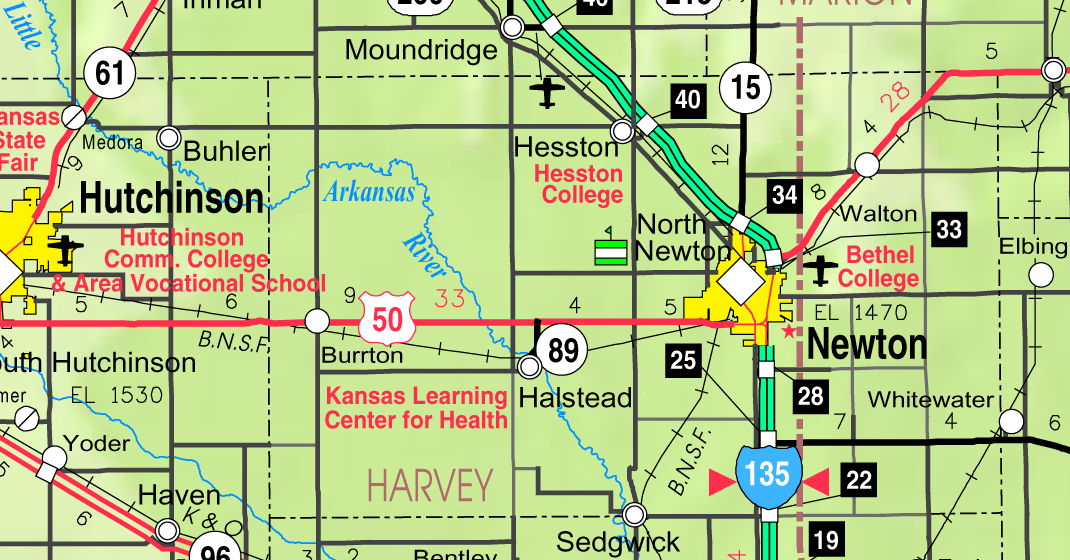
- KDOT map of Harvey County (legend)
- Coordinates: 38°07′07″N 97°15′30″W
- Country: United States
- State: Kansas
- County: Harvey
- Township: Walton
- Founded: 1871
- Platted: 1871
- Incorporated: 1886
- Named for: ATSF stockholder

Government
  - Type: Mayor–Council
  - Mayor: Barry Wentz

Area
  - Total: 0.31 sq mi (0.81 km^{2})
  - Land: 0.31 sq mi (0.81 km^{2})
  - Water: 0 sq mi (0.00 km^{2})
- Elevation: 1,532 ft (467 m)

Population (2020)
  - Total: 219
  - Density: 700/sq mi (270/km^{2})
- Time zone: UTC-6 (CST)
  - Summer (DST): UTC-5 (CDT)
- ZIP Code: 67151
- Area code: 620
- FIPS code: 20-75200
- GNIS ID: 2397186
- Website: waltonkansas.com

Walton is a city in Harvey County, Kansas, United States. It is named in honor of one of the 19th century stockholders of Atchison, Topeka and Santa Fe Railway. As of the 2020 census, the population of the city was 219.

== History ==
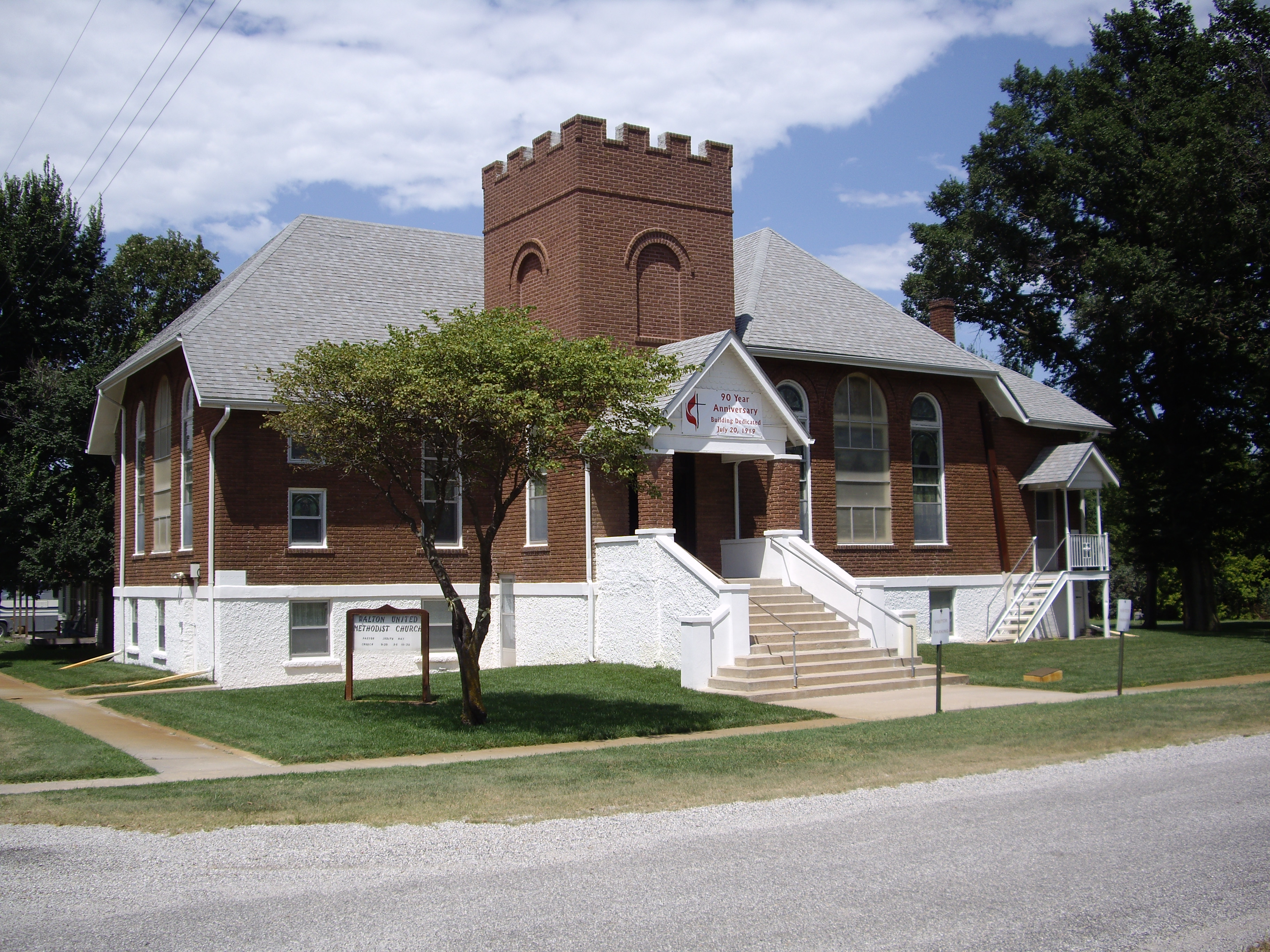
Walton United Methodist Church (2010). Dedicated on July 20, 1919.

=== Early history ===
For many millennia, the Great Plains of North America was inhabited by nomadic Native Americans. From the 16th century to 18th century, the Kingdom of France claimed ownership of large parts of North America. In 1762, after the French and Indian War, France secretly ceded New France to Spain, per the Treaty of Fontainebleau.

=== 19th century ===
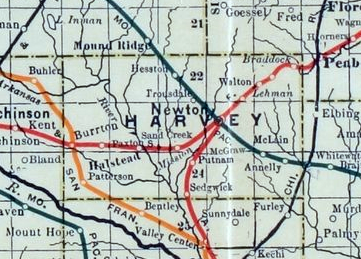
1915 railroad map of Harvey County

In 1802, Spain returned most of the land to France. In 1803, most of the land for modern day Kansas was acquired by the United States from France as part of the 828,000 square mile Louisiana Purchase for 2.83 cents per acre.

In 1854, the Kansas Territory was organized, then in 1861, Kansas became the 34th U.S. state. In 1872, Harvey County was established within the Kansas Territory, which included the land for modern day Walton.

In 1871, the Atchison, Topeka and Santa Fe Railway extended a main line from Emporia through Walton to Newton, reaching Walton and Newton in July. In 1996, it merged with Burlington Northern Railroad and renamed to the current BNSF Railway. Most locals still refer to this railroad as the "Santa Fe".

Walton was laid out as a town site in December 1871 by William Mathews. He built a home, and this was followed by a general store and railroad section house. Because of difficulty in perfecting title to the lots, the town-site remained dormant until it was sold to J.F. Watson and he filed a plat of the town in 1876. In 1871, a Kansas one room school, measuring 18 x 20 feet, was built and the first school was held by Mrs. M. J. Sharron. A post office was established in Walton on December 28, 1871, Mrs. E. Peck as Postmistress.

=== 20th century ===
The New Santa Fe Trail road was routed through Walton in the late 1910s. Initially, the road entered the north side of the city on Walton Ave. The trail became U.S. Route 50 in the late 1930s, when the new highway was routed northeast to southwest parallel to the railroad.

== Geography ==
Walton is near the dividing line between the Cottonwood and Arkansas River basins and near the highest ground in Harvey County.

According to the United States Census Bureau, the city has a total area of 0.36 square miles (0.93 km^{2}), all land.

== Area events ==
- Walton Rural Life Festival, every October.

== Area attractions ==
- Kansas Historical Marker - Red Turkey Wheat, on north side of US-50 near the northeastern city limits.

== Demographics ==
Historical population
Census	Pop.	Note	%±
1880	162		—
1890	249		53.7%
1900	174		−30.1%
1910	357		105.2%
1920	228		−36.1%
1930	212		−7.0%
1940	217		2.4%
1950	220		1.4%
1960	225		2.3%
1970	211		−6.2%
1980	269		27.5%
1990	226		−16.0%
2000	284		25.7%
2010	235		−17.3%
2020	219		−6.8%
U.S. Decennial Census

=== 2010 census ===
As of the census of 2010, there were 235 people, 93 households, and 69 families residing in the city. The population density was 652.8 inhabitants per square mile (252.0/km^{2}). There were 105 housing units at an average density of 291.7 per square mile (112.6/km^{2}). The racial makeup of the city was 93.2% White, 0.4% African American, 5.1% Native American, 0.4% Asian, and 0.9% from two or more races. Hispanic or Latino of any race were 6.0% of the population.

There were 93 households, of which 30.1% had children under the age of 18 living with them, 58.1% were married couples living together, 10.8% had a female householder with no husband present, 5.4% had a male householder with no wife present, and 25.8% were non-families. 23.7% of all households were made up of individuals, and 9.7% had someone living alone who was 65 years of age or older. The average household size was 2.53 and the average family size was 2.88.

The median age in the city was 40.9 years. 21.7% of residents were under the age of 18; 8.5% were between the ages of 18 and 24; 21.7% were from 25 to 44; 30.7% were from 45 to 64; and 17.4% were 65 years of age or older. The gender makeup of the city was 57.0% male and 43.0% female.

=== 2000 census ===
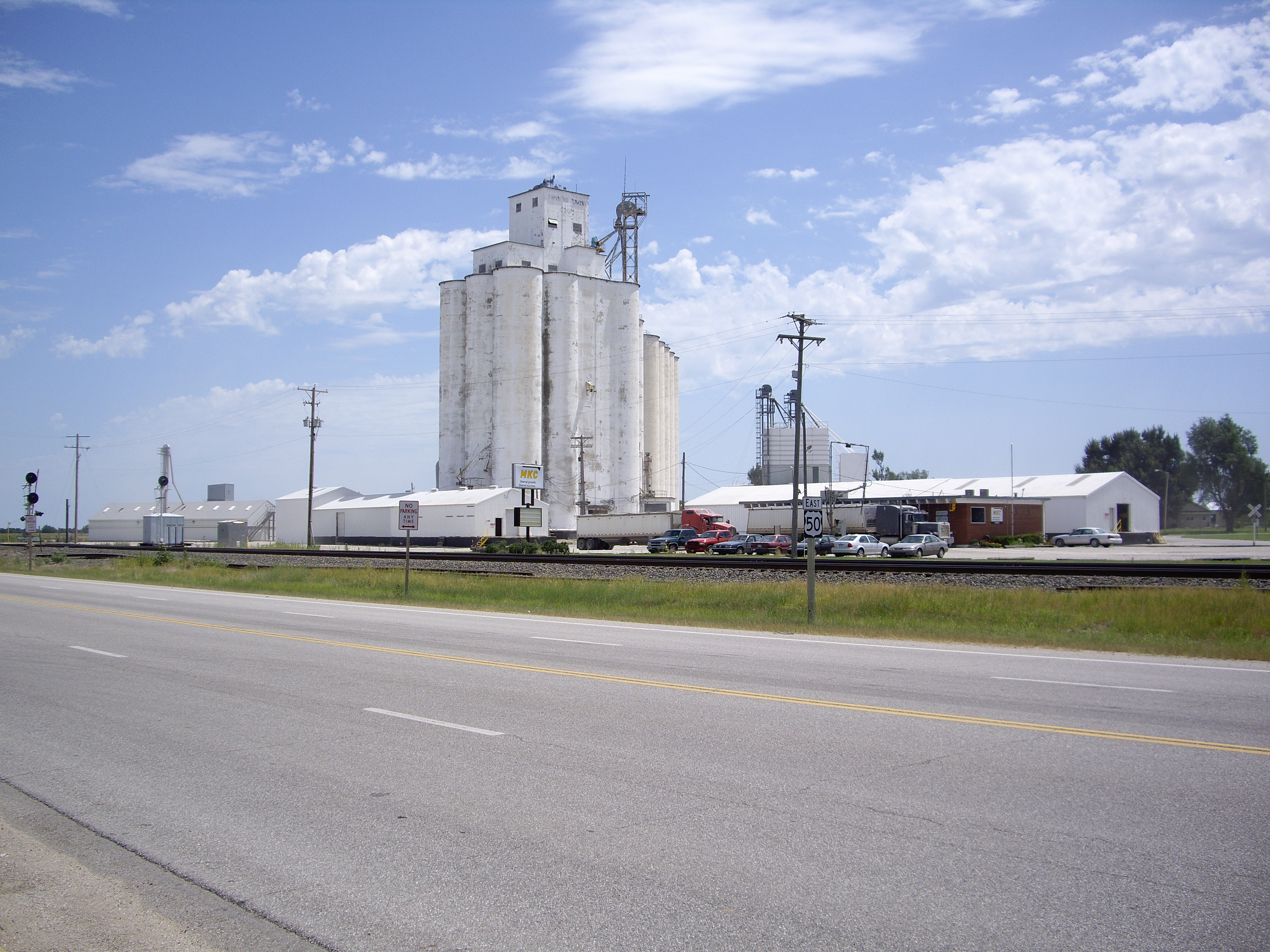
Mid Kansas Cooperative, east side of BNSF Railway and US-50 (2010)

As of the census of 2000, there were 284 people, 109 households, and 79 families residing in the city. The population density was 1,162.6 inhabitants per square mile (448.9/km^{2}). There were 118 housing units at an average density of 483.1 per square mile (186.5/km^{2}). The racial makeup of the city was 95.42% White, 1.41% African American, 1.06% Native American, 1.06% from other races, and 1.06% from two or more races. Hispanic or Latino of any race were 3.87% of the population.

There were 109 households, out of which 42.2% had children under the age of 18 living with them, 56.0% were married couples living together, 10.1% had a female householder with no husband present, and 27.5% were non-families. 23.9% of all households were made up of individuals, and 7.3% had someone living alone who was 65 years of age or older. The average household size was 2.61 and the average family size was 3.10.

In the city, the population was spread out, with 32.0% under the age of 18, 8.5% from 18 to 24, 33.8% from 25 to 44, 16.9% from 45 to 64, and 8.8% who were 65 years of age or older. The median age was 31 years. For every 100 females, there were 129.0 males. For every 100 females age 18 and over, there were 114.4 males.

As of 2000 the median income for a household was $34,375, and the median income for a family was $39,500. Males had a median income of $30,781 versus $18,882 for females. The per capita income for the city was $16,679. About 9.1% of families and 11.1% of the population were below the poverty line, including 16.5% of those under the age of eighteen and none of those 65 or over.

== Government ==
The Walton government consists of a mayor and five council members. The council meets once a month.

- City Hall, Police Department, Fire Department, 122 Main St.
- US Post Office, 301 S 2nd Ave.

== Education ==
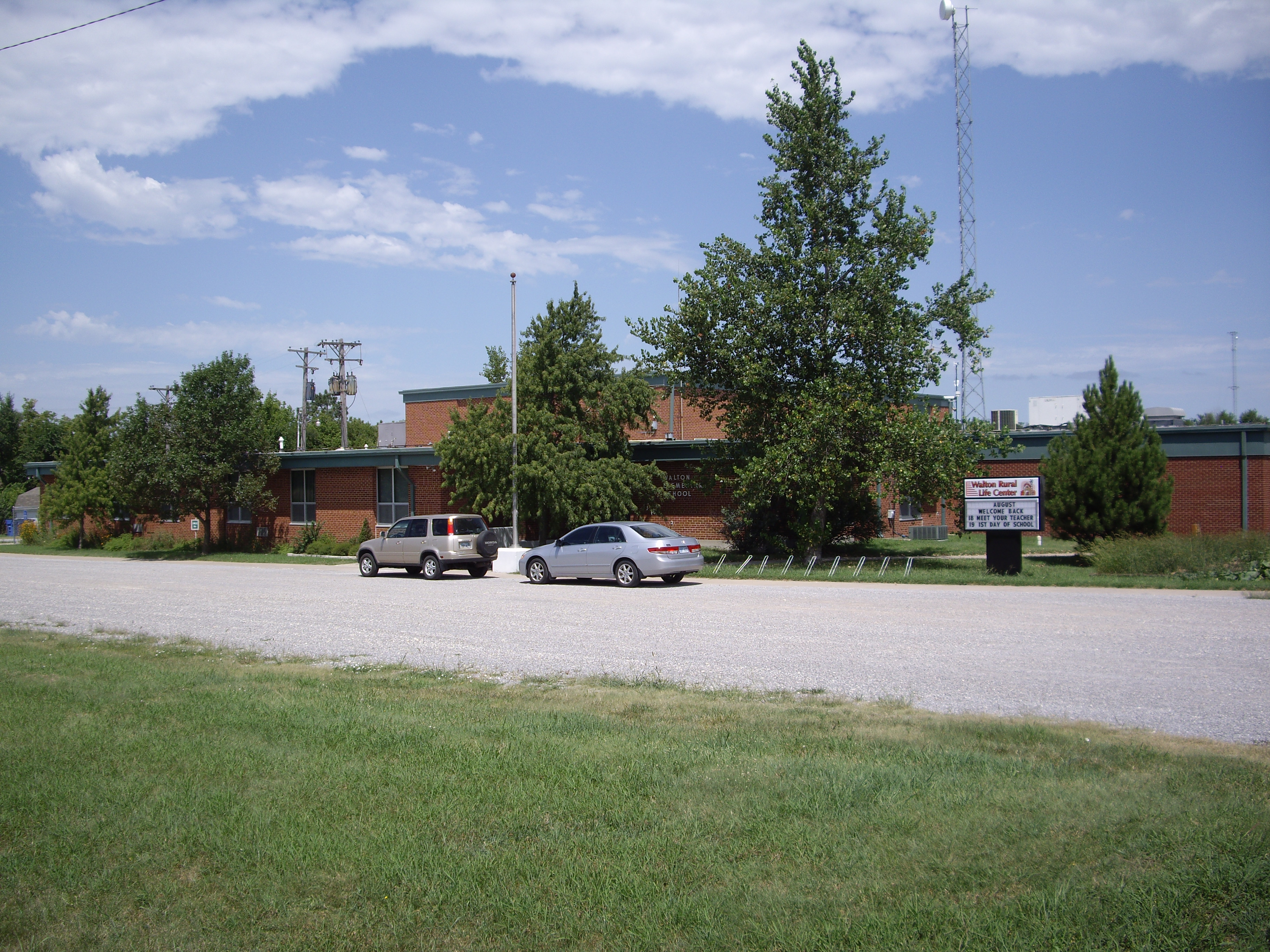
Walton Rural Life Center (charter elementary) School (2010)

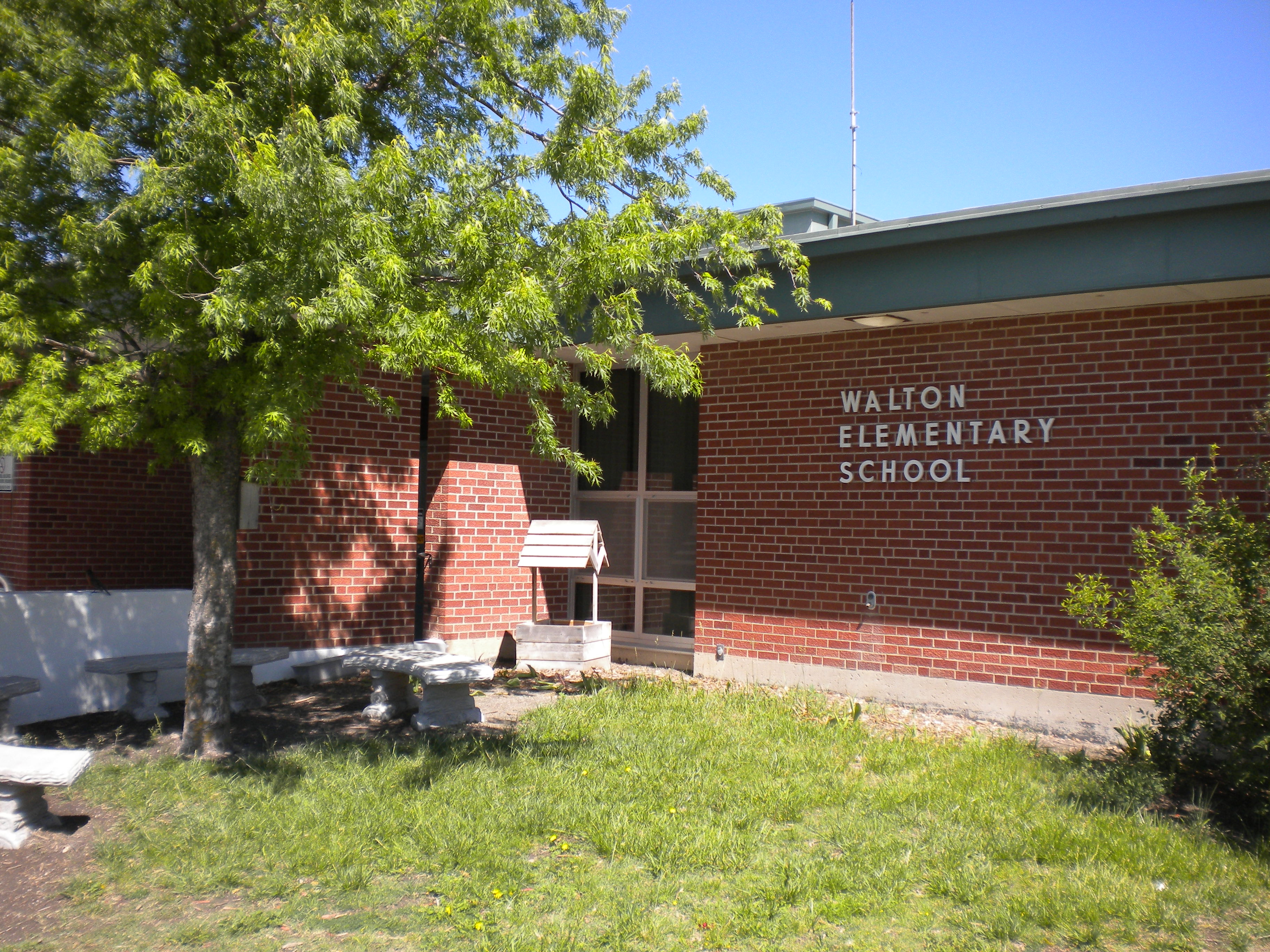
500 W Main St (2009)

=== Primary and secondary education ===
The community is served by Newton USD 373 public school district. Walton students of junior and high school ages attend school in Newton.

- Walton Rural Life Center, 500 West Main Street, a charter elementary school, Grades PreK–4.

Walton High School was closed through school unification. The Walton High School mascot was Walton Wildcats.

=== Library ===
- Walton Community Library, 122 Main St.

=== Film ===
Using Agriculture to Spur Achievement : The Walton 21st Century Rural Life Center, 2011, U.S. Department of Education filmed a documentary at the Walton 21st Century Rural Life Center charter elementary school in November 2010. The crew also interviewed farm families, teachers, students, and community members. The resulting video will be featured on their website, highlighting the center as a best practices model of innovation in education.

== Media ==
=== Print ===
- Hillsboro Free Press, free newspaper for greater Marion County area.
- The Newton Kansan, regional newspaper from Newton.
- The Wichita Eagle, major regional newspaper from Wichita.

=== Radio ===
Walton is served by numerous radio stations of the Wichita-Hutchinson listening market area, and satellite radio. See Media in Wichita, Kansas.

=== Television ===
Walton is served by over-the-air ATSC digital TV of the Wichita-Hutchinson viewing market area, cable TV, and satellite TV. See Media in Wichita, Kansas.

== Infrastructure ==
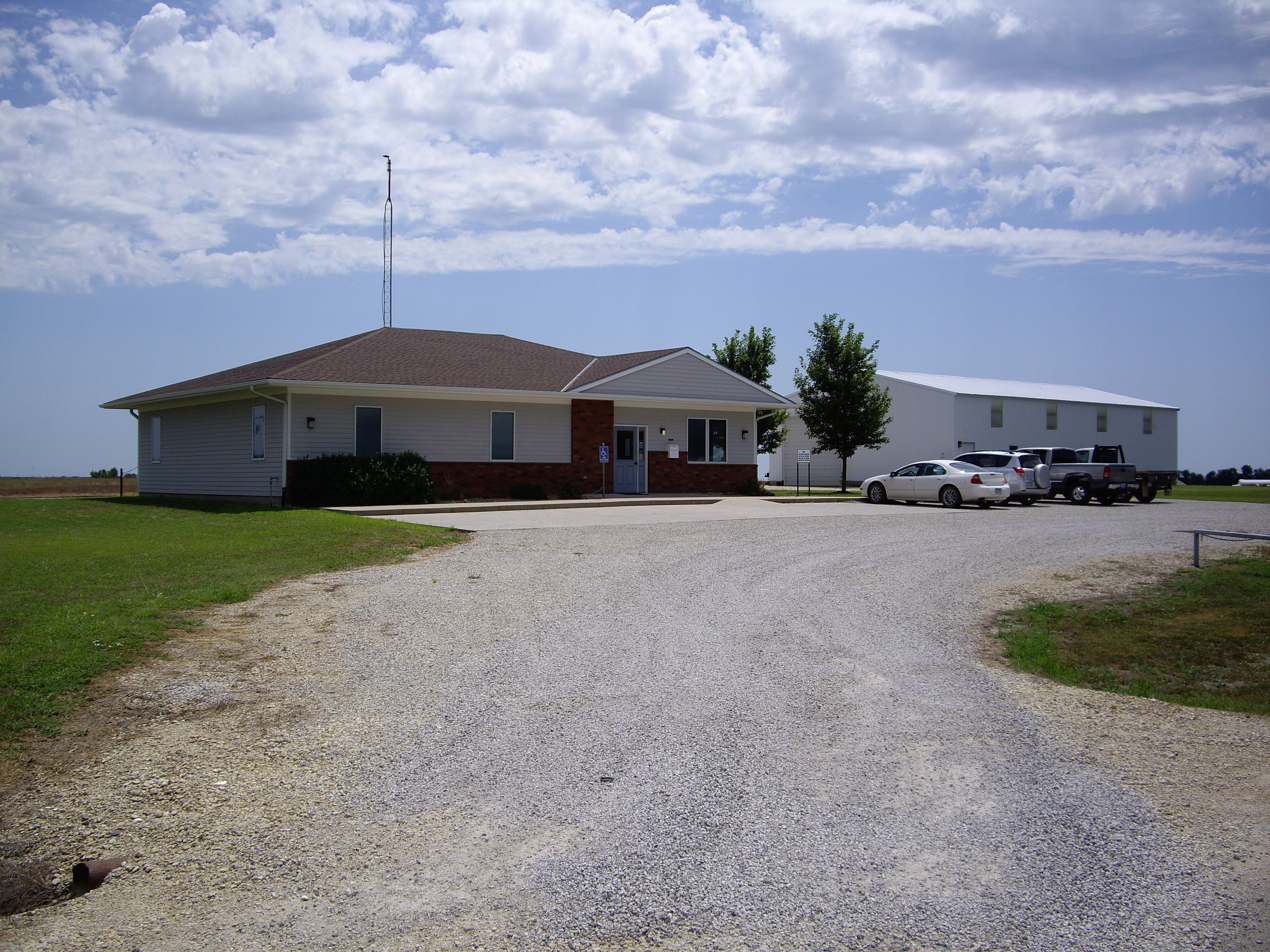
Harvey County Rural Water District #1 at 210 Esau Ave (2010)

=== Transportation ===
A major highway US-50 and a railroad BNSF Railway pass through Walton. US-50 was originally the New Santa Fe Trail and roughly parallels the BNSF Railway.

The Amtrak Southwest Chief stops in nearby Newton twice each day and provides passenger rail service to Los Angeles and Chicago. See Newton station.

=== Utilities ===
- Internet
  - DSL is provided by CenturyLink.
  - Wireless is provided by Pixius Communications (wireless), Verizon (cellular).
  - Satellite is provided by HughesNet, StarBand, WildBlue.
- TV
  - Satellite is provided by DirecTV, Dish Network.
  - Terrestrial is provided by regional digital TV stations.
- Telephone
  - Landline is provided by CenturyLink.
  - Cell Phone is provided by Verizon.
- Electricity
  - City is provided by Westar Energy.
  - Rural is provided by Flint Hills RECA.
- Natural Gas
  - Service is provided by KMGA, billed by City of Walton.
- Water
  - City is provided by Harvey County RWD #1, billed by City of Walton.
  - Rural is provided by Harvey County RWD #1.
- Sewer
  - Service is provided by City of Walton.
- Trash
  - Service is provided by Waste Connections, billed by City of Walton.

== Notable people ==
See also List of people from Harvey County, Kansas

- Guy Hawk, Kansas House of Representatives, Banker

== See also ==
- La Junta Subdivision, branch of the BNSF Railway
