= Baron Whaddon =

Baron Whaddon may refer to:

- Derek Page, Baron Whaddon (1927–2005), British life peer and politician
- George Villiers, 1st Duke of Buckingham (1592–1628), who held the title Baron Whaddon before becoming Duke of Buckingham
