= Walton station =

Walton station may refer to:

Cambridgeshire:

- Walton railway station (Cambridgeshire), closed 1953

Essex:

- Walton-on-the-Naze railway station

Liverpool:

- Walton railway station (Merseyside)
- Walton & Anfield railway station, closed 1948
- Walton on the Hill railway station, closed 1968

London:

- Walton-on-Thames railway station

Lahore, Pakistan:

- Walton railway station (Pakistan)
