= Wadwick =

Village and parish in Hampshire, England

Coordinates: 51.275265°N 1.38249°W

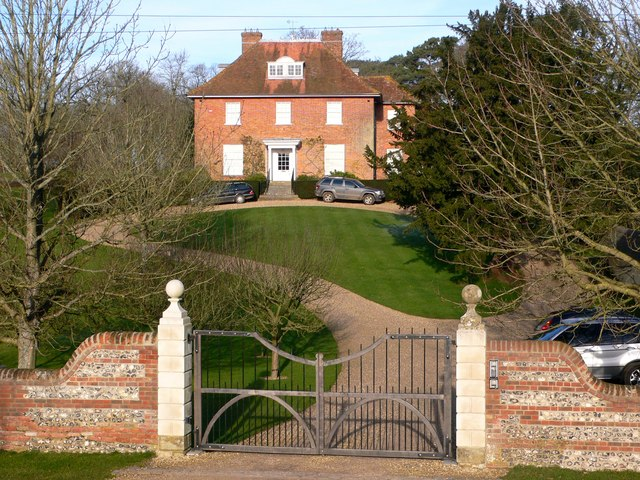
- Wadwick House

- Location within Hampshire
- OS grid reference: SU4317153083
- Civil parish: Wadwick
- District: Basingstoke and Deane
- Shire county: Hampshire
- Region: South East
- Country: England
- Sovereign state: United Kingdom
- Post town: ANDOVER
- Postcode district: SP11
- Dialling code: 01264
- Police: Hampshire and Isle of Wight
- Fire: Hampshire and Isle of Wight
- Ambulance: South Central
- UK Parliament: North West Hampshire

Wadwick is a hamlet and civil parish situated in the North Wessex Downs Area of Outstanding Natural Beauty in the Basingstoke and Deane district of Hampshire, England. It is in the civil parish of St Mary Bourne. Its nearest town is Andover, which lies approximately 6.1 miles (10 km) south-west, although it lies two miles closer to Whitchurch.
