= Wolton =

Wolton may refer to:

- Wolton (surname), including a list of people with the name
- Wolton, Wyoming

== See also ==
- Woolton, a suburb of Liverpool, UK
