= Walton High School =

Walton High School refers to:

== United Kingdom ==
- Walton High School, Milton Keynes, Buckinghamshire
- Walton High School, Nelson, Lancashire
- Walton High School, Stafford

== United States ==
- Walton High School (DeFuniak Springs, Florida)
- George Walton Comprehensive High School in Cobb County, Georgia
- Walton High School, Walton, Kansas, closed, merged with Newton High School (Kansas).
- Walton High School (Bronx), New York

== See also ==
- South Walton High School, Walton County, Florida, United States
- Walton-Verona High School, Walton, Kentucky, United States
