= Waldley =

Coordinates: 52.931°N 1.812°W

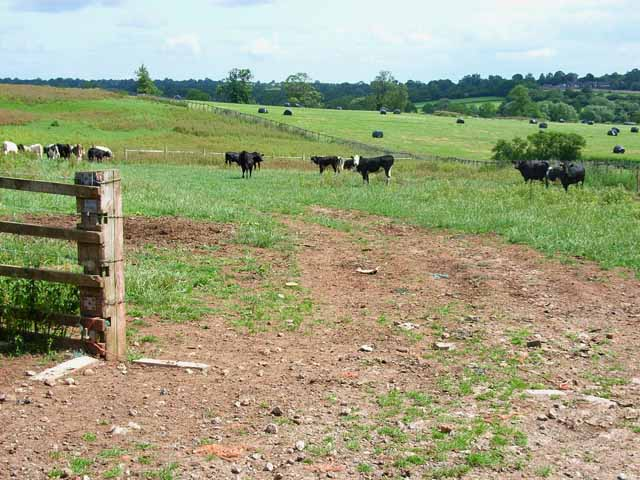
- Waldley.

- Location within Derbyshire
- Population: 14 - 25
- OS grid reference: SK127370
- District: Derbyshire Dales
- Shire county: Derbyshire
- Region: East Midlands
- Country: England
- Sovereign state: United Kingdom
- Post town: ASHBOURNE
- Postcode district: DE6
- Police: Derbyshire
- Fire: Derbyshire
- Ambulance: East Midlands

Waldley is a hamlet in Derbyshire, England. It is located 2 miles (3.2 km) north of Doveridge.

Waldley has had many spellings, let alone pronunciations. Pronounced as Walled-lee... It was originally spelt as Wardley, but it is believed that the OS Mappers mis-wrote it and it then forever came Waldley.

The hamlet is part of the Derbyshire Dales constituency, and the current MP is the Conservative Sarah Dines.
