= Walton Township, Harvey County, Kansas =

Township in Kansas, United States

Walton Township Harvey County, Kansas
- Township
- Location within Harvey County

- Location within state of Kansas
- Coordinates: 38.1307472°N 97.2088825°W
- Country: United States
- State: Kansas
- County: Harvey

Area
  - Total: 36.69 sq mi (95.02 km^{2})
  - Land: 36.66 sq mi (94.96 km^{2})
  - Water: 0.023 sq mi (0.06 km^{2}) 0.06%
- Elevation: 1,467 ft (447 m)

Population (2020)
  - Total: 469
  - Density: 12.8/sq mi (4.94/km^{2})
- Time zone: UTC-6 (CST)
  - Summer (DST): UTC-5 (CDT)
- FIPS code: 20-75225
- GNIS ID: 477771
- Website: County website

Walton Township is a township in Harvey County, Kansas, United States. As of the 2020 census, its population was 469.

== Geography ==
Walton Township covers an area of 36.69 square miles (95.0 km^{2}) and contains one incorporated settlement, Walton.

== Cemeteries ==
According to the USGS, it contains one cemetery, Walton.

== Transportation ==
A major highway, US-50 and a railroad, BNSF Railway pass through Walton Township. US-50 was originally the New Santa Fe Trail and roughly parallels the BNSF Railway.

The Amtrak Southwest Chief stops in nearby Newton twice each day and provides passenger rail service towards Los Angeles and Chicago. See Newton (Amtrak station).
