= Wall End =

Coordinates: 51.530773°N 0.066884°E

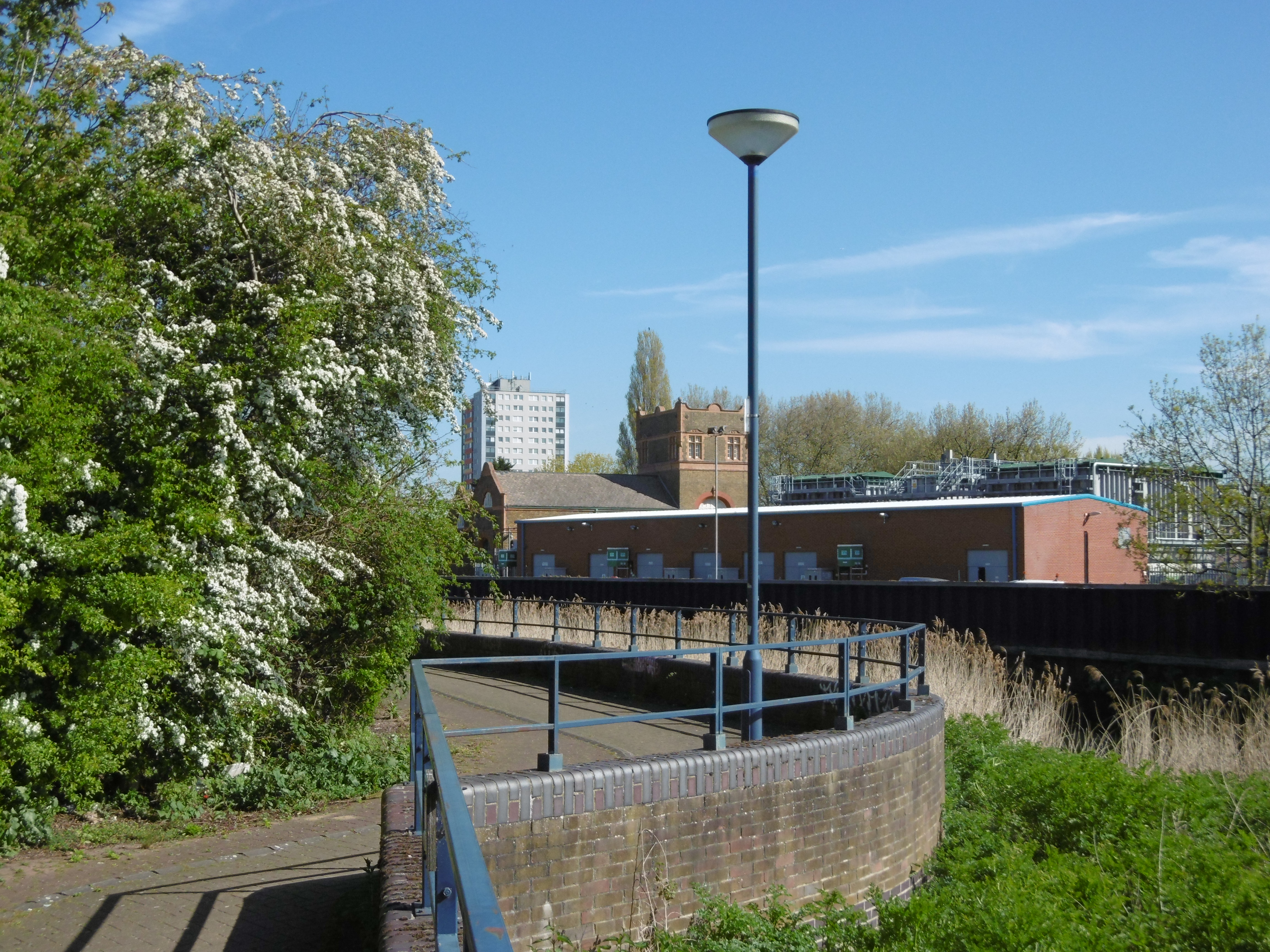
- The riverbank at Wallend, looking north across the Roding at Barking

- Location within Greater London
- London borough: Newham
- Ceremonial county: Greater London
- Region: London
- Country: England
- Sovereign state: United Kingdom
- Post town: LONDON
- Postcode district: E6
- Dialling code: 020
- Police: Metropolitan
- Fire: London
- Ambulance: London
- London Assembly: City and East

Wall End (sometimes spelt as Wallend) is a locality in East Ham in East London, located in the borough of Newham. It is a little-used name for the area lying to the north of Beckton between Barking and East Ham. The name stems from an embankment wall that was formerly used to prevent flooding from the river Roding at the 'end' or 'outlying part' of East Ham. Much of the area consists of terraced housing dating from the building-boom of the late 19th century. It is notable, as with the rest of East Ham, for having an especially high British Tamil population.
