= The Waltons (disambiguation) =

The Waltons is an American television series that ran from 1972 to 1981.

The Waltons may also refer to:

- The Waltons (Canadian band), an alternative rock band from Saskatchewan
- Walton family, the wealthiest family in America
- Walton sextuplets, all-female sextuplets born in 1983
