= Walton Group =

Bangladeshi smartphone, Motorcycle, computer, Laptop manufacturer company

- Type: Public Limited Company
- Traded as: DSE: WALTONHIL; CSE: WALTONHIL
- Industry: Telecommunications; Consumer Electronics; Information technology; Smartphones; Electronics
- Founded: 1977; 49 years ago commencement of business activities 2008; 18 years ago debuted as Walton Group
- Founder: S.M Nazrul Islam
- Headquarters: Kaliakair, Gazipur, Bangladesh
- Area served: Worldwide
- Key people: S.M Shamsul Alam (Chairman); S.M. Ashrful Alam (Vice-Chairman); S.M. Mahbubul Alam (Managing Director); S.M. Nurul Alam Rezvi (Director); S.M. Rezaul Alam (Director); S.M Monjurul Alam (Director); Raisa Sigma (Director); Tahmina Afrose (Director); Rifah Tasnia (Director); Sabiha J. Orona (Director); Nishat Tasnim Shuchi (Director)
- Products: List: Refrigerator & Freezer; Television; Smartphone; Feature phone; Computer; Air Conditioner; telecommunications equipment; Washing Machine; Kitchen & Electrical Appliances; Elevator; Compressor; Generator; Industrial Solutions
- Brands: List: Walton Motors; Walton Mobile; Walton Electronics; Walton Hi-Tech Industries Limited
- Services: Electronics manufacturing services
- Revenue: ▲ ৳81.68 billion (US$670 million) (FY 2022)
- Operating income: ▼ ৳18.7 billion (US$150 million) (FY 2022)
- Net income: ▲ ৳12.17 billion (US$99 million) (FY 2022)
- Total assets: ▲ ৳160.44 billion (US$1.3 billion) (FY 2022)
- Total equity: ▲ ৳101.38 billion (US$830 million) (FY 2022)
- Number of employees: 30,000+
- Website: waltonbd.com waltonplaza.com.bd waltondigitech.com

Walton Group (Bengali: ওয়ালটন; stylised as WALTON) is a Bangladeshi multinational electronics conglomerate headquartered in Bashundhara Residential Area, Dhaka. It was founded in 1977 by S.M. Nazrul Islam and operates in consumer electronics, home appliances, mobile phones, automobiles, and retail. The group's flagship company is Walton Hi-Tech Industries PLC.

With over 30,000 employees, Walton operates more than 1,000 retail stores under the brand name "Walton Plaza" and has an international presence in China, India, and the United States.

The company has presence in consumer electronics, real estate, and retail sectors. In 2019, it was ranked as the second-largest corporate donor in Bangladesh by the CSR Centre and Sustainability Excellence. Walton is the largest tech company in Bangladesh by market cap.

== History ==
Walton was founded by S.M Nazrul Islam. Nazrul started his career as a small businessman. After the Bangladesh Liberation War of 1971, he started a separate business. In 1977, he founded a new company named after his eldest son S.M Nurul Alam Rezvi called Rezvi & Brothers, abbreviated as R.B. Group. At that time, they used to import televisions. The company made its debut in 2008 as the Walton Group by starting refrigerator manufacture. When S.M Nazrul Islam died in 2017, his eldest son S.M Nurul Alam Rezvi took over as the chairman of the company.

In April 2017, Walton established the country's first compressor manufacturing factory.

In January 2018, Walton opened a computer assembly plant. At the same time it began exporting laptops to Nigeria.

The company expanded into TV export market to around 14 countries in Europe, including Germany, Denmark, Ireland, Poland, Greece, Spain, Croatia, Italy and Romania.

In February 2020, Walton started exporting handsets to the United States as a Bangladeshi original equipment manufacturer company to an American brand, otherwise known as "contract manufacturing".

In April 2022, Walton acquired 3 European brands to make 4.8 million compressors a year. Walton Hi-Tech Industries PLC announced the purchase of two more brands – Zanussi Elettromeccanica (ZEM) and Verdichter (VOE) – from Italia Wanbao-ACC. It acquired the rights of three European electronics brands and its production plant, a trademark, patent, design and software.

In June 2022, Walton announced the establishment of a Research and Innovation Centre in South Korea.

== Acquisitions ==
- In April 2022, Walton bought 3 European brands aimed at producing 4.8 million compressors a year.

== Manufacturing and production ==
- In April 2017, Walton established a compressor manufacturing factory.
- In April 2017, Walton inaugurated a smartphone manufacturing factory in Bangladesh.
- In January, 2018, Walton opened its first computer and laptop assembly plant in Bangladesh.
- In April 2020, during the COVID-19 pandemic in Bangladesh, Walton announced plans to produce ventilators.

== Controversies ==
In April 2024, Walton was accused of promoting LGBTQ rights in Bangladesh after sponsoring a drama show called Rupantor. In response, on 16 April, the company apologized and released a statement saying they were unaware of the content of the show, and sent a legal notice to the agency 'Local Bus Entertainment' for airing the show, stating it was a breach of contract.

== Subsidiaries ==
The conglomerate comprises one public traded and over ten privately held companies.

- Walton Hi-Tech Industries PLC. (public)
- Walton Digi-Tech Industries Ltd. (merged with Walton Hi-Tech Industries)
- Walton Plaza
- RB Group of Companies Limited
- Walton Corporation Limited
- Walton Micro-Tech Corporation
- Dream Park International
- Walton Shipping & Logistics
- Walton Chemical Industries
- Skyroute Media Ltd.
- Walton Agro Farm & Industries
- Walton Motor Industries Ltd.

=== Walton Hi-Tech Industries ===
Walton Hi-Tech Industries is the electronics appliance and consumer electronics section of the company. Marcel is a sub-brand of this section.

== See also ==
- List of companies of Bangladesh
