= List of Bethel Threshers head football coaches =

Otto Unruh was head coach for two separate time periods, first from 1929–1942 and then again from 1967–1969. He is credited with inventing the "T-Wing" offense.

The Bethel Threshers football program is a college football team that represents Bethel College in the Kansas Collegiate Athletic Conference, a part of the NAIA. The team has had 23 head coaches since its first recorded football game in 1914.

Only two coaches have achieved post-season play: Kent Rogers managed to bring a squad team to post-season play. Mike Moore took his 2006 team to the 2006 NAIA Football National Championship, losing in the first round to the Missouri Valley Vikings.

== Key ==
Key to symbols in coaches list
General		Overall		Conference		Postseason (Note: Although the first Rose Bowl Game was played in 1902, it has been continuously played since the 1916 game, and is recognized as the oldest bowl game by the NCAA. "—" indicates any season prior to 1916 when postseason games were not played.)	
No.	Order of coaches (Note: A running total of the number of head coaches, with coaches who served separate tenures being counted only once. Interim head coaches are represented with "Int" and are not counted in the running total. "—" indicates the team played but either without a coach or no coach is on record. "X" indicates an interim year without play.)	GC	Games coached	CW	Conference wins	PW	Postseason wins
DC	Division championships	OW	Overall wins	CL	Conference losses	PL	Postseason losses
CC	Conference championships	OL	Overall losses	CT	Conference ties	PT	Postseason ties
NC	National championships	OT	Overall ties (Note: Overtime rules in college football were introduced in 1996, making ties impossible in the period since.)	C%	Conference winning percentage		
†	Elected to the College Football Hall of Fame	O%	Overall winning percentage (Note: When computing the win–loss percentage, a tie counts as half a win and half a loss.)				

== Coaches ==
No.	Name	Term	GC	OW	OL	OT	O%	CW	CL	CT	C%	PW	PL	CCs	Awards
1	William E. Schroeder	1914–1916	7	1	6	0	.143	—	—	—	—	—	—	—	—
2	Gus A. Hauray, Jr.	1922–1927	34	5	29	0	.147	—	—	—	—	—	—	—	—
3	Walter Miller	1928	7	0	7	0	.000	—	—	—	—	—	—	—	—
4	Otto D. Unruh	1919–1942; 1967–1969	135	53	76	6	.415	—	—	—	—	—	—	—	Member Kansas Sports Hall of Fame.
5	Bob Tully	1946–1948	25	6	18	1	.260	—	—	—	—	—	—	—	—
6	J. M. Fretz	1949–1951	26	5	21	0	.192	—	—	—	—	—	—	—	—
7	David Unruh	1952	9	2	7	0	.222	—	—	—	—	—	—	—	—
8	Gilbert Galle	1953	9	2	6	1	.278	—	—	—	—	—	—	—	—
9	Milton Goering	1954–1959	44	14	28	2	.341	—	—	—	—	—	—	—	—
10	George Buhr	1957	9	5	4	0	.556	—	—	—	—	—	—	—	—
11	Wesley Buller	1960–1964	45	17	26	2	.400	—	—	—	—	—	—	—	—
12	Eugene Reusser	1965–1966	18	1	17	0	.056	—	—	—	—	—	—	—	—
13	Lee Cissel	1970–1971	18	4	14	0	.222	—	—	—	—	—	—	—	—
14	Jimmie Corns	1972–1976	45	23	22	0	.511	—	—	—	—	—	—	—	—
15	Jim Paramore	1977–1978	18	7	11	0	.389	—	—	—	—	—	—	—	—
16	Kent Rogers	1979–1994	150	69	80	1	.463	—	—	—	—	—	1	—	—
17	George Papageorgiou	1995–1999	47	18	29	0	.383	—	—	—	—	—	—	—	—
18	Mike Moore	1999–2009	98	47	51	0	.480	—	—	—	—	—	1	—	—
19	Travis Graber	2010–2011	21	2	19	0	.095	—	—	—	—	—	—	—	—
20	James Dotson	2012	10	0	10	0	.000	—	—	—	—	—	—	—	—
21	Martin Mathis	2013–2014	23	5	17	0	.233	—	—	—	—	—	—	—	—
22	Morris Lolar	2015–2017	30	7	23	0	.300	—	—	—	—	—	—	—	—
23	Terry Harrison	2017–2021	53	30	23	0	.566	—	—	—	—	—	—	—	—
24	A. B. Stokes	2022–present	21	15	5	0	.714	—	—	—	—	—	—	—	—

== See also ==
- List of people from Harvey County, Kansas
