= Martin Mathis =

American football coach

Playing career
- 1989–1992: Minnesota
- Position: Middle linebacker

Coaching career (HC unless noted)
- 1998–2001: Holy Cross HS (KY) (DC)
- 2002: Purcell Marian HS (OH) (LB/ST)
- 2003–2004: Rose-Hulman (DC/ST)
- 2005–2012: Marian (IN) (AHC/DC/RC)
- 2013–2014: Bethel (KS)
- 2015: Walsh (DC)
- 2016: Cincinnati Hills Christian Academy (OH) (LB)
- 2017: Alderson Broaddus (LB)
- 2018–2021: Villa Angela-St. Joseph HS (OH) (DC)
- 2022: Adrian (DC)
- 2023–2025: Avila (DC/ST)

Head coaching record
- Overall: 5–17

Martin Mathis is an American college football coach. He most recently served as the defensive coordinator and special teams coordinator for Avila University, positions he held from 2023 to 2025. He served as the head football coach at Bethel College in North Newton, Kansas from 2013 to 2014. He was hired beginning with the 2013 season. Mathis replaced James Dotson, who held the position for one season after the sudden resignation of Travis Graber on July 27, 2012. Mathis resigned as head coach of Bethel on March 5, 2015, to take a job with Walsh University in North Canton, Ohio. He was replaced by Morris Lolar.

== Head coaching record ==
Year	Team	Overall	Conference	Standing	Bowl/playoffs
Bethel Threshers (Kansas Collegiate Athletic Conference) (2013–2014)
2013	Bethel	2–9	1–8	T–9th	
2014	Bethel	3–8	2–7	T–8th	
Bethel:		5–17	3–15		
Total:		5–17			
