= List of people from Harvey County, Kansas =

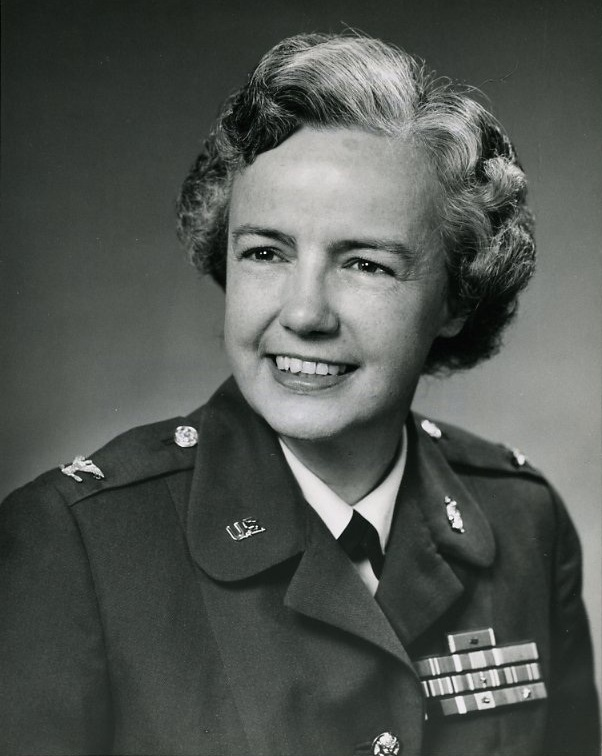
Harvey County native Elizabeth P. Hoisington as a Colonel and Director of the Women's Army Corps. She later become one of the first women in the United States Army promoted to Brigadier General.

The following is a list of people from Harvey County, Kansas. Inclusion on the list should be reserved for notable people past and present who have resided in the county, either in cities or rural areas.

== Academics ==
- Errett Bishop, mathematician
- John Keeny, president of Louisiana Tech University from 1908 to 1926
- Ruth Emma Mitten, Harvey County superintendent of schools

== Athletics ==
See also List of Bethel Threshers head football coaches

- Monty Beisel, professional football player
- Tony Clark, professional baseball player
- Andy Dirks, professional baseball player for the Detroit Tigers; competed in the 2012 World Series
- Harold E. Foster, member of the Naismith Memorial Basketball Hall of Fame
- Brian Moorman, professional football player for the Buffalo Bills
- Dustin Richardson, professional baseball player
- Jim Roper, NASCAR driver
- Adolph Rupp, one of the most successful college basketball coaches in the history of American college basketball and member of the Naismith Memorial Basketball Hall of Fame
- Otto D. Unruh, college football coach credited with inventing the "T-Wing" offense
- Mike Wellman, professional football player

== Arts ==
- Tom Adair, songwriter, composer and screenwriter
- Reed Crandall, comic book artist
- Milburn Stone, television actor

== Business ==
- Jacob A. Schowalter, Kansas farmer and business owner whose estate formed the basis of the Schowalter Foundation
- Lyle Yost, founder of Hesston Corporation

== Health and medicine ==
- John M. Janzen, leading figure on issues of health, illness, and healing in Southern and Central Africa

== Journalism ==
- Jeremy Hubbard, television news anchor

== Military ==
- Elizabeth P. Hoisington, United States Army officer, one of the first women to attain the rank of Brigadier General

== Politics and law ==
- Rita Clements, former First Lady of Texas
- John Houston, member of the United States House of Representatives from 1935 to 1943
- Howard McMurray, United States Representative from Wisconsin
- Kimberly Mueller, Judge of the United States District Court for the Eastern District of California
- Errett Scrivner, United States Representative from Kansas
- Jesse Unruh, "Big Daddy Unruh," Democratic politician
- John Yoder, Kansas and West Virginia state judge; West Virginia state senator

== See also ==
- Lists of people from Kansas
