= George Papageorgiou =

American football coach (died 2024)

Current position
- Conference: HAAC

Biographical details
- Born: c. 1956
- Died: May 18, 2024 (aged 68)

Playing career
- 1978: Washington
- Position: Fullback

Coaching career (HC unless noted)
- 1988: Pacific (OR) (assistant)
- 1989–1991: Pacific (OR) (DC)
- 1992: Willamette (LB)
- 1993–1994: Willamette (OL)
- 1995–1999: Bethel (KS)
- 2000–2024: Benedictine (assistant)

Head coaching record
- Overall: 18–29

Accomplishments and honors

Awards
- KCAC Coach of the Year (1996); AFCA Assistant Coach of the Year (2022)

George Papageorgiou (c. 1956 – May 18, 2024) was an American football coach and player. He was an assistant coach at Benedictine College. Papageorgiou served as the head football coach at Bethel College in North Newton, Kansas, from 1995 to 1999, compiling a record of 18–29. Papageorgiou died on May 18, 2024, at the age of 68.

== Playing career ==
Papageorgiou played college football at the University of Washington as a fullback. He played under head coach Don James and saw action in 11 games for the 1978 season—gaining 75 yards on 87 attempts while scoring five touchdowns.

== Coaching career ==
=== Assistant coaching ===
Papageorgiou was an assistant coach at Washington until 1983, working with both running backs and the defensive line. Before taking the head coach position at Bethel he was an assistant for the Willamette Bearcats in Salem, Oregon. He was an assistant in Wichita, KS for af2's Wichita Stealth arena team from 2001 to 2003. He was an assistant coach at Benedictine in Atchison, Kansas. In 2022, he was named the NAIA Assistant Football Coach of the Year by the American Football Coaches Association.

=== Bethel ===
Papageorgiou was the head football coach at Bethel College in North Newton, Kansas, serving for five seasons, from 1995 until 1999, and compiling a record of 18–29. He was named Kansas Collegiate Athletic Conference (KCAC) Coach of the Year in 1996 after leading Bethel to an overall record of 7–3 and a second-place finish in the KCAC with a conference mark of 7–1. Bethel went 5–5 in 1998, but was forced to forfeit all five of those victories in 1999 when it was discovered that an ineligible player has participated during the season. Papageorgiou resigned midway through the 1999 season, on November 3, and was replaced by Mike Moore on an interim basis.

== Head coaching record ==
Year	Team	Overall	Conference	Standing	Bowl/playoffs
Bethel Threshers (Kansas Collegiate Athletic Conference) (1995–1999)
1995	Bethel	4–5	4–4	T–5th	
1996	Bethel	7–3	7–1	2nd	
1997	Bethel	5–5	4–4	T–4th	
1998	Bethel	0–10 (Note: Bethel finished the 1998 season with overall record of 5–5 and conference mark of 4–4, tying for fourth place. In 1999, they forfeited all five victories because of an ineligible player.)	0–8	T–4th	
1999	Bethel	2–6 (Note: Papageorgiou led the team for the first eight games of the 1998 before resigning on November 3. Mike Moore was appointed interim head coach for the remainder of the season. Bethel finished the year with an overall record of 3–7 and conference mark of 2–6, tying for seventh place.)	2–5		
Bethel:		18–29	17–22		
Total:		18–29			
