= George Buhr =

American football coach

Biographical details
- Born: July 28, 1918; Mountain Lake, Minnesota, U.S.
- Died: July 24, 2005 (aged 76); North Newton, Kansas, U.S.

Coaching career (HC unless noted)

Football
- 1957: Bethel (KS)

Football
- 1955–1965: Bethel (KS)

Head coaching record
- Overall: 5–4 (football); 132–117 (basketball)

George Buhr (July 28, 1918 – July 24, 2005) was an American football and basketball coach. He was the head football coach at Bethel College in North Newton, Kansas, serving for one season, in 1957, and compiling a record of 5–4.

== Early life and education ==
Buhr was born on July 28, 1918, in Mountain Lake, Minnesota.

== Career ==
=== Head coaching record ===
==== Football ====
Year	Team	Overall	Conference	Standing	Bowl/playoffs
Bethel Graymaroons (Kansas Collegiate Athletic Conference) (1957)
1957	Bethel	5–4	5–2	T–3rd	
Bethel:		5–4	5–2		
Total:		5–4			

== Death ==
Buhr died on July 24, 2005, at age 76.

== See also ==
- List of Mennonites
- List of people from Kansas
- List of people from Minnesota
