= Unruh =

Unruh (or Unrug) is a surname. It may refer to:

== People ==
=== Military ===
- Hiram A. Unruh (1845–1916), American soldier during the Civil War, later a businessman in California
- Jerry L. Unruh (born 1939), former United States Navy officer
- Józef Unrug (1884–1973, also known as Joseph von Unruh), Polish naval officer
- Walter von Unruh (1877–1956), German army officer during both World Wars

=== Politics ===
- Hans Victor von Unruh (1806–1886), Prussian politician
- Jesse M. Unruh (1922–1987), American politician in California
- Jessica Unruh, American politician in North Dakota
- Trude Unruh (1925–2021), German politician

=== Sports ===
- David Unruh (fl. 1952), American football coach
- Les Unruh (born c. 1934), American football coach
- Lisa Unruh (born 1988), German archer
- Otto D. Unruh (1899–1992), American football player and coach
- Paul Unruh (1928–2023), American basketball player

=== Other ===
- Fritz von Unruh (1885–1970), German dramatist
- Heather Unruh (born 1968), American journalist
- Howard Unruh (1921–2009), American spree killer
- Jack Unruh (1935–2016), American illustrator
- Leslee Unruh, American activist
- N. U. Unruh (born 1957), German musician
- W. G. Unruh (born 1945), Canadian physicist
- Zygmunt Unrug (1676–1732; also known as Sigismund von Unruh), Polish nobleman of German descent, ambassador to the Kingdom of Prussia

== Other uses ==
- 24045 Unruh, a minor planet discovered in 1999
- Jesse M. Unruh State Office Building, in Sacramento, California, U.S.
- Unruh Civil Rights Act, an expansive 1959 California law, named after the American politician
- Unruh effect, a theoretical prediction in quantum field theory, named after the Canadian physicist

== See also ==
- Umrah, an Islamic pilgrimage to Mecca
- "Unruhe", an episode of The X-Files
