= Jimmie Corns =

American football player and coach

Playing career
- c. 1960: College of Emporia
- Position: Guard

Coaching career (HC unless noted)
- ?–1970: Hiawatha HS (KS)
- 1971: Highland (KS)
- 1972–1976: Bethel (KS)

Head coaching record
- Overall: 18–28 (college); 1–8 (junior college)

Jimmie Corns is an American former football coach. He was the head football coach at Bethel College in North Newton, Kansas for five seasons, from 1972 to 1976, compiling a record of 18–28.

Corns coached at Hiawatha High School in Hiawatha, Kansas and then was the head football coach at Highland Community College in Highland, Kansas for one season, in 1971, leading his team to a record of 1–8. Corns resigned from his post at Bethel in December 1976 to enter private business.

== Head coaching record ==
=== College ===
Year	Team	Overall	Conference	Standing	Bowl/playoffs
Bethel Threshers (Kansas Collegiate Athletic Conference) (1972–1976)
1972	Bethel	3–7	3–5	T–7th	
1973	Bethel	3–6	3–5	6th	
1974	Bethel	5–4	5–3	T–2nd	
1975	Bethel	2–7 (Note: Bethel forfeited 6 conference games—to Bethany (KS), Kansas Wesleyan, Southwestern (KS), Friends, Tabor, and Sterling—due to an ineligible player.)	2–6	T–8th	
1976	Bethel	5–4	5–3	T–3rd	
Bethel:		18–28	18–22		
Total:		18–28			
