= Walter Miller (American football) =

American football coach

Coaching career (HC unless noted)
- 1928: Bethel (KS)

Head coaching record
- Overall: 0–7

Walter Miller was an American football coach. He was the head football coach at Bethel College in North Newton, Kansas, serving for one season, in 1928, and compiling a record of 0–7.

== Head coaching record ==
Year	Team	Overall	Conference	Standing	Bowl/playoffs
Bethel Graymaroons (Kansas Collegiate Athletic Conference) (1928)
1928	Bethel	0–7	0–6	T–9th	
Bethel:		0–7	0–6		
Total:		0–7			
