= Cissel =

Cissel may refer to:

- Jewish rye bread, also called cissel bread
- Chuck Cissel (born 1948), American entertainer
- Lee Cissel (1932–1977), American football coach

== See also ==
- Dickcissel
- Sisal
- Sissel
