= Kent Rogers (American football) =

American football coach

Coaching career (HC unless noted)
- 1968: Rossville HS (KS) (assistant)
- 1969–1974: Nemaha Valley HS (KS)
- 1975–1978: Hesston HS (KS)
- 1979–1994: Bethel (KS)

Head coaching record
- Overall: 69–80–1 (college); 60–34 (high school)
- Tournaments: 0–1 (NAIA D-II playoffs)

Accomplishments and honors

Championships
- 1 KCAC (1984)

Kent E. Rogers is an American former football coach. He was the head football coach at Bethel College in North Newton, Kansas, serving for 19 seasons, from 1979 to 1994, and compiling a record of 69–80–1.

Rogers attended Fairview High School in Fairview, Kansas and later graduated from Kansas State Teachers College at Emporia—now Emporia State University—in 1968 with a degree in physical education and mathematics. He began his coaching career that same year as an assistant coach in football, basketball, and track at Rossville High School in Rossville, Kansas. In 1969, he became the head football coach at Nemaha Valley High School in Seneca, Kansas. Rogers led his teams at Nemaha Valley to a record of 40–17 in six seasons. In 1975, he moved on to Hesston High School Hesston, Kansas, as a head coach, guiding his teams to a mark of 20–17 in four seasons.

Rogers earned a master's degree from Wichita State University.

== Honors ==
Rogers was selected to work with the Kansas Shrine Bowl all-star game as an assistant coach in 1974 and as the head coach of the East team in 1975. In 2009, he was named to the Kansas Shrine Bowl Hall of Fame.

While at Bethel, Rogers was named the conference coach of the year six times and served as president of the NAIA football coaches association in 1992 and 1993. In 1984, he was named All-District 10 coach of the year. In 2003, Bethel College named him to their Athletic Hall of Fame.

== Head coaching record ==
=== College ===
| Year | Team | Overall | Conference | Standing | Bowl/playoffs |
|---|---|---|---|---|---|
Bethel Threshers (Kansas Collegiate Athletic Conference) (1979–1994)
| 1979 | Bethel | 3–6 | 3–5 | T–5th | |
| 1980 | Bethel | 3–5–1 | 3–4–1 | 5th | |
| 1981 | Bethel | 1–8 | 1–7 | 9th | |
| 1982 | Bethel | 3–6 | 3–6 | 8th | |
| 1983 | Bethel | 6–3 | 6–3 | 4th | |
| 1984 | Bethel | 9–1 | 9–0 | 1st | L NAIA Division II First Round |
| 1985 | Bethel | 7–2 | 7–2 | T–2nd | |
| 1986 | Bethel | 7–2 | 7–2 | T–2nd | |
| 1987 | Bethel | 3–6 | 3–6 | T–6th | |
| 1988 | Bethel | 5–5 | 5–4 | T–4th | |
| 1989 | Bethel | 5–5 | 4–5 | T–5th | |
| 1990 | Bethel | 3–7 | 2–7 | T–7th | |
| 1991 | Bethel | 4–6 | 3–6 | T–6th | |
| 1992 | Bethel | 3–6 | 2–6 | T–7th | |
| 1993 | Bethel | 3–6 | 3–5 | T–6th | |
| 1994 | Bethel | 4–6 | 3–5 | 6th | |
| Bethel: | | 69–80–1 | 64–73–1 | | |
| Total: | | 69–80–1 | | | |
