= Gilbert Galle =

American football coach

Biographical details
- Born: November 18, 1918; Moundridge, Kansas, U.S.
- Died: November 26, 2007 (aged 89); Moundridge, Kansas, U.S.

Coaching career (HC unless noted)
- 1953: Bethel (KS)

Head coaching record
- Overall: 1–7–1

Gilbert David Galle (November 18, 1918 – November 26, 2007) was an American football coach. He was the head football coach at Bethel College in North Newton, Kansas, serving for one season, in 1953, and compiling a record of 1–7–1.

== Head coaching record ==
Year	Team	Overall	Conference	Standing	Bowl/playoffs
Bethel Graymaroons (Kansas Collegiate Athletic Conference) (1953)
1953	Bethel	1–7–1	0–6–1	8th	
Bethel:		1–7–1	0–6–1		
Total:		1–7–1			
