= Morris Lolar =

American gridiron football player and coach (born 1970)

Current position
- Title: Cornerbacks coach
- Team: Southeast Missouri State
- Conference: OVC

Biographical details
- Born: December 18, 1970; Arkansas City, Kansas, U.S.

Playing career
- 1989: Minnesota
- 1990–1992: Friends
- 1993–1996: Edmonton Eskimos
- 1997–1998: Winnipeg Blue Bombers
- Position: Defensive back

Coaching career (HC unless noted)
- 1998–1999: Friends (DB)
- 2000–2002: Wichita Northwest HS (KS) (DB)
- 2003–2005: Wichita North HS (KS) (DC)
- 2006: Texas A&M–Commerce (DB)
- 2007–2008: Wichita East HS (KS) (DC)
- 2009–2012: Friends (DB)
- 2009–2011: Wichita Wild (assistant)
- 2011: Wichita Wild (interim HC)
- 2012–2013: Wichita Wild
- 2013: Northwest Mississippi (ST/DB)
- 2014: Independence (DC)
- 2015–2017: Bethel (KS)
- 2018: Defiance (DC/LB)
- 2019: Montreal Alouettes (DB)
- 2020–2021: Dodge City CC (DB)
- 2022: Mary Hardin–Baylor (DB)
- 2023: Missouri Valley (DC/DB)
- 2024–present: Southeast Missouri State (CB)

Head coaching record
- Overall: 7–23 (college); 26–11 (indoor football)

Morris Lolar (born December 18, 1970) is an American gridiron football coach and former player. He is the cornerbacks coach for Southeast Missouri State University, a position he has held since 2024. Lolar served as the head football coach at Bethel College in North Newton, Kansas from 2015 to 2017, compiling a record of 7–23. He was the head coach for the Wichita Wild of the Indoor Football League from 2011 to 2013.

Lolar began his college football playing career at the University of Minnesota before transferring to Friends University in Wichita, Kansas. He played for all or part of five CFL seasons, first with the Edmonton Eskimos and then with the Winnipeg Blue Bombers.

Lolar also coached for his alma mater Friends, Wichita Northwest High School, Wichita North High School, Texas A&M–Commerce, Wichita East High School, Northwest Mississippi Community College, Independence Community College, Defiance, the Montreal Alouettes of the Canadian Football League (CFL), Dodge City Community College, Mary Hardin–Baylor, and Missouri Valley.

== Head coaching record ==
=== College ===
Year	Team	Overall	Conference	Standing	Bowl/playoffs
Bethel Threshers (Kansas Collegiate Athletic Conference) (2015–2017)
2015	Bethel	3–7	3–6	T–5th	
2016	Bethel	3–7	3–6	7th	
2017	Bethel	1–9	1–8	10th	
Bethel:		7–23	7–20		
Total:		7–23			
