= Travis Graber =

American football coach

Coaching career (HC unless noted)
- 1999: Wamego HS (KS) (assistant)
- 2000–2001: Lawrence HS (KS) (assistant)
- 2002–2009: Bethel (KS) (assistant)
- 2010–2011: Bethel (KS)

Head coaching record
- Overall: 2–19

Travis Graber is an American football coach. He served as the head football coach at Bethel College in North Newton, Kansas from 2010 to 2011, compiling a record of 2–19.

== Coaching career ==
In 2010, first-year head coach Graber took over a team that completed prior season a record of 3–7. Graber was the team's defensive coordinator in 2009 and was promoted to the job after head coach Mike Moore resigned. Graber's record at Bethel was 2–19.

On July 27, 2012, Graber resigned his position with a little more than a month before the beginning of the 2012 season. School and athletic administration stated that it was entirely his decision to resign.

== Head coaching record ==
Year	Team	Overall	Conference	Standing	Bowl/playoffs
Bethel Threshers (Kansas Collegiate Athletic Conference) (2010–2011)
2010	Bethel	0–10	0–9	10th	
2011	Bethel	2–9	2–7	9th	
Bethel:		2–19	2–16		
Total:		2–19			
