= Showalter =

The Showalter/Schowalter family originates from the Swiss village Strengelbach. The first known member, Hans Schonwalder, was mentioned in a 1566 record tax record. Later, the family converted to Anabaptism. Because of religious persecution and poverty, they migrated to Palatinate (Germany), Alsace (France) and from there to the U.S., where most of them live today, numbering over 10,000 people. The Showalter variant is only found in America today, with the vast majority living in the U.S. and a small number in Canada, while the Schowalter variant is found in the German state of Rhineland-Palatinate and the U.S.

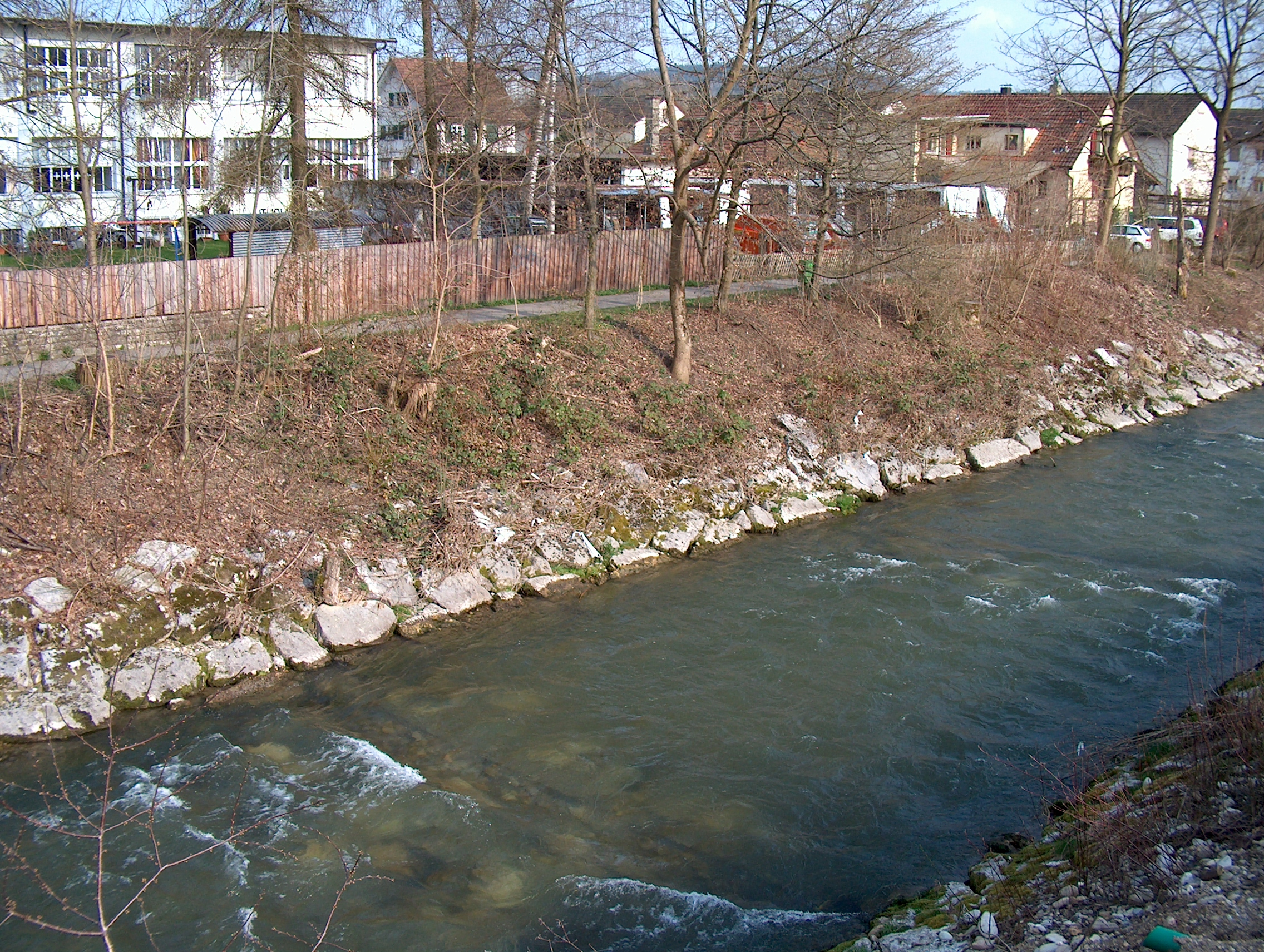
Wigger river between Strengelbach and Zofingen, the first members of the family farmed here

== Notable members ==
- Anthony Johnson Showalter (1858–1924), American gospel music composer, teacher and publisher
- Albert K. Showalter (1908-1986), American meteorologist
- Buck Showalter (born 1956), American baseball player and manager
- Dennis Showalter (1942–2019), American historian
- Daniel Showalter (1830–1866), American miner, state legislator, duelist, secessionist and Confederate soldier
- Don Showalter, chemist
- Edward R. Schowalter Jr. (1927–2003), American soldier
- Elaine Showalter (born 1941), American literary critic, feminist, and writer on cultural and social issues
- Elmer J. Schowalter (1894–1964), American politician
- Gena Showalter (born 1975), American author in the genres of contemporary romance, paranormal romance and young adult
- Henry O. Schowalter (1909–1998), American politician
- Herbert Schowalter (1927–1998), American politician
- Jackson Showalter (1860–1935), American chess player
- Jacob A. Schowalter (1879–1953), American farmer, business owner and philanthropist
- Joseph Baltzell Showalter (1851–1932), American politician in Pennsylvania
- Mark R. Showalter (born 1957), American astronomer
- Max Showalter (1917–2000), American film, television and stage actor
- Michael Showalter (born 1970), American actor, writer, and director and part of the sketch comedy trio Stella
- Morgan Showalter (born 1988), American DJ/Music Producer, part of the duo Materia Blū

== See also ==
- Schowalter Foundation, a Kansas-based Mennonite philanthropic foundation
- Showalter Field, a multi-purpose stadium in Winter Park, Florida
- Showalter Index (SI), a dimensionless number indicating the instability of an air mass and the potential of formation of thunderstorms.
