= William E. Schroeder =

American football coach

Coaching career (HC unless noted)
- 1914–1916: Bethel (KS)

Head coaching record
- Overall: 1–6

William E. Schroeder was an American football coach. He was the head football coach at Bethel College in North Newton, Kansas, serving for three seasons, from 1914 to 1916, and compiling a record of 1–6.

== Head coaching record ==
Year	Team	Overall	Conference	Standing	Bowl/playoffs
Bethel (Independent) (1914–1915)
1914	Bethel	0–1			
1915	Bethel	1–2			
Bethel (Kansas Collegiate Athletic Conference) (1916)
1916	Bethel	0–3	0–3	T–14th	
Bethel:		1–6	0–3		
Total:		1–6			
