= Gus A. Haury Jr. =

American football coach

Biographical details
- Born: July 31, 1895; Newton, Kansas, U.S.
- Died: September 2, 1952 (aged 57); Stuttgart, Germany

Coaching career (HC unless noted)
- 1922–1927: Bethel (KS)

Head coaching record
- Overall: 5–30

Gustav Adolph Haury Jr. (July 31, 1895 – September 2, 1952) was an American football coach. He was the head football coach at the Bethel College in North Newton, Kansas, serving for six seasons, from 1922 to 1927, and compiling a record of 5–30. He was the elder brother of Southwest American anthropologist Emil Haury.

== Head coaching record ==
Year	Team	Overall	Conference	Standing	Bowl/playoffs
Bethel Graymaroons (Kansas Collegiate Athletic Conference) (1922–1927)
1922	Bethel	0–3	0–3	T–15th	
1923	Bethel	0–5	0–5	T–15th	
1924	Bethel	1–4	1–4	15th	
1925	Bethel	2–4	1–4	T–11th	
1926	Bethel	0–7	0–6	T–15th	
1927	Bethel	2–7	0–6	T–16th	
Bethel:		5–30	2–28		
Total:		5–30			
