= J. M. Fretz =

American football coach

Biographical details
- Born: October 5, 1912; Lansdale, Pennsylvania, U.S.
- Died: April 11, 1999 (aged 86); Wichita, Kansas, U.S.

Coaching career (HC unless noted)
- 1949–1951: Bethel (KS)

Head coaching record
- Overall: 5–21

Jacob Millard Fretz (October 5, 1912 – April 11, 1999) was an American football coach. He was the head football coach at Bethel College in North Newton, Kansas, serving for three seasons, from 1949 to 1951, and compiling a record of 5–21. Fretz died in 1999.

== Head coaching record ==
Year	Team	Overall	Conference	Standing	Bowl/playoffs
Bethel Graymaroons (Kansas Collegiate Athletic Conference) (1949–1951)
1949	Bethel	3–5	2–4	6th	
1950	Bethel	1–8	0–6	7th	
1951	Bethel	1–8	0–6	7th	
Bethel:		5–21	2–16		
Total:		5–21			
