= Milton Goering =

American football coach

Biographical details
- Born: October 12, 1923; McPherson, Kansas, U.S.
- Died: October 15, 2009 (aged 86); Moundridge, Kansas, U.S.

Coaching career (HC unless noted)
- 1954–1956: Bethel (KS)
- 1958–1959: Bethel (KS)

Head coaching record
- Overall: 15–27–2

Milton Merl Goering (October 12, 1923 – October 15, 2009) was an American football coach. He was the head football coach for the Bethel College in North Newton, Kansas, serving for five seasons, from 1954 to 1956 and again from 1958 to 1959, compiling a record of 15–27–2. Goering was also director of athletics and dean of students at a point at Bethel. He is a member of the Bethel College Athletic Hall of Fame. He died in 2009. His daughter, Susan Goering, became an influential civil rights lawyer in Maryland.

== Head coaching record ==
Year	Team	Overall	Conference	Standing	Bowl/playoffs
Bethel Graymaroons (Kansas Collegiate Athletic Conference) (1954–1956)
1954	Bethel	4–3–1	4–2–1	T–3rd	
1955	Bethel	4–5	4–3	T–4th	
1956	Bethel	4–5	4–3	4th	
Bethel Graymaroons (Kansas Collegiate Athletic Conference) (1958–1959)
1958	Bethel	3–5–1	2–4–1	T–6th	
1959	Bethel	0–9	0–7	8th	
Bethel:		15–27–2	14–19–2		
Total:		15–27–2			
