= Lee Cissel =

American football coach

Biographical details
- Born: May 27, 1932
- Died: October 28, 1977 (aged 45); Broward County, Florida, U.S.

Coaching career (HC unless noted)
- 1970–1971: Bethel (KS)

Head coaching record
- Overall: 4–14

Lee Fairfax Cissel (May 27, 1932 – October 28, 1977) was an American football coach. He was the head football coach for the Bethel College in North Newton, Kansas, serving for two seasons, from 1970 to 1971, and compiling a record of 4–14.

Cissel had previously coached for the United States Navy and Vanderbilt University. He resided in Fort Lauderdale, Florida.

== Head coaching record ==
Year	Team	Overall	Conference	Standing	Bowl/playoffs
Bethel Threshers (Kansas Collegiate Athletic Conference) (1970–1971)
1970	Bethel	4–5	3–2	T–2nd (South)	
1971	Bethel	0–9	0–8	9th	
Bethel:		4–14	3–10		
Total:		4–14			
