= Jacob Ewert =

American activist (1874–1923)

Jacob Gerhard Ewert (November 24, 1874 – March 16, 1923), also known as J. G. Evert, was a Mennonite socialist and pacifist from Hillsboro, Kansas. From 1909 he was editor of the German-language newspaper Hillsboro Journal, later renamed Vorwärts. Ewert wrote books and pamphlets on socialism, on temperance, and on warfare. The historian Duane Sotltzfus described Ewert as a "tireless advocate for conscientious objectors, writing articles and counseling many draftees" when writing for Vorwärts. The Newton, Kansas, newspaper Der Herold, edited by H. P. Krehbiel, challenged his published support of socialist agendas.

Ewert attended the Mennonite Bethel College in North Newton, Kansas, and later taught both there and at a Mennonite Brethren college, Tabor College in Hillsboro, Kansas.
