= David Unruh =

American football coach

Coaching career (HC unless noted)
- 1952: Bethel (KS)

Head coaching record
- Overall: 2–7

David Unruh was an American football coach. He was the head football coach at Bethel College in North Newton, Kansas, serving for one season, in 1952, and compiling a record of 2–7.

== Head coaching record ==
Year	Team	Overall	Conference	Standing	Bowl/playoffs
Bethel Graymaroons (Kansas Collegiate Athletic Conference) (1952)
1952	Bethel	2–7	0–6	7th	
Bethel:		2–7	0–6		
Total:		2–7			
