= Mike Moore (American football coach) =

American football player and coach

Playing career
- 1987–1988: Dodge City CC
- 1990: Kansas State
- Position: Safety

Coaching career (HC unless noted)
- 1993–1995: McPherson HS (KS) (DB/ST)
- 1996: Nebraska–Omaha (LB)
- 1997–1999: Bethel (KS) (DC)
- 1999–2009: Bethel (KS)
- 2016–?: Newton HS (KS) (AHC/DC)

Head coaching record
- Overall: 47–51
- Tournaments: 0–1 (NAIA playoffs)

Accomplishments and honors

Championships
- 2 KCAC (2006–2007)

Awards
- 2× KCAC Coach of the Year (2000, 2006)

Mike Moore is an American former football coach. He served as the head football coach at Bethel College in North Newton, Kansas from 1999 to 2009, compiling a record of 47–51.

Moore played junior college football at Dodge City Community College in Dodge City, Kansas and college football at Kansas State University, lettering for the Wildcats in 1990. He began his coaching career as an assistant McPherson High School in McPherson, Kansas and spent a year as an assistant at the University of Nebraska Omaha before he was hired in 1997 at Bethel as assistant head coach and defensive coordinator. Moore was appointed Bethel's interim head coach after George Papageorgiou resigned during the 1999 season.

Moore was twice named Kansas Collegiate Athletic Conference (KCAC) Coach of the Year, in 2000 and 2006. He led the Bethel Threshers to the program's first NAIA Football National Championship berth in 2006. In 2016, Moore was hired as assistant head coach and defensive coordinator at Newton High School in Newton, Kansas to assist head coach Chris Jaax.

== Head coaching record ==
Year	Team	Overall	Conference	Standing	Bowl/playoffs	NAIA^{#}
Bethel Threshers (Kansas Collegiate Athletic Conference) (1999–2009)
1999	Bethel	1–1 (Note: George Papageorgiou served as head coach for the first eight games of the 1998 before resigning on November 3. Moore was appointed interim head coach for the remainder of the season. Bethel finished the year with an overall record of 3–7 and conference mark of 2–6.)	0–1	T–7th		
2000	Bethel	8–2	7–2	2nd		22
2001	Bethel	1–9	1–8	T–9th		
2002	Bethel	1–8	1–8	9th		
2000	Bethel	4–5	4–5	T–6th		
2004	Bethel	4–5	4–5	T–6th		
2005	Bethel	3–7	2–7	T–8th		
2006	Bethel	9–2	8–1	T–1st	L NAIA First Round	15
2007	Bethel	8–1	8–1	T–1st		17
2008	Bethel	6–4	5–4	T–4th		
2009	Bethel	3–7	3–6	T–6th		
Bethel:		47–51	44–48			
Total:		47–51				
