= Reusse =

Reusse is a surname. Notable people with the surname include:

- Patrick Reusse, American sportswriter and radio personality
- Peter Reusse (1941–2022), German actor

== See also ==
- Reusser
