= Sissel =

Sissel is a Norwegian female given name, a variant of Cecilia.

Notable people called Sissel include:

== Real people ==
- Sissel Solbjørg Bjugn (1947–2011), a Norwegian poet and children's writer
- Sissel Birgitte Breie (born 1953), a Norwegian diplomat
- Sissel Buchholdt, née Brenne (born 1951), a Norwegian handball player
- Sissel Grottenberg (born 1956), a retired Norwegian long-distance runner
- Sissel Knutsen Hegdal (born 1965), a Norwegian politician for the Conservative Party
- Sissel Kyrkjebø (born 1969), also known as Sissel, Norwegian singer
- Sissel Lange-Nielsen, née Herlofson (born 1931), a Norwegian writer, literary critic, and journalist
- Sissel Lie (born 1942), a Norwegian novelist, translator, playwright and professor in Romance languages and literature at the University of Trondheim
- Sissel Benneche Osvold (born 1945), a Norwegian journalist
- Sissel Vera Pettersen (born 1977), a Norwegian jazz vocalist, saxophonist and composer
- Sissel Rønbeck (born 1950), a Norwegian politician for the Labour Party
- Sissel Sellæg (1928–2014), a Norwegian actress
- Sissel Tolaas, a contemporary Norwegian installation artist most widely known for her work with odours

== Fictional characters ==
- Sissel, the male main character in the video game Ghost Trick: Phantom Detective

== Food ==
- Jewish rye bread, also called sissel bread

== See also ==
- Sissel (album), the 1986 debut album from Sissel Kyrkjebø
- Sissel (2002 album), an album by Sissel Kyrkjebø
- Sandi Sissel (born 1949), an American cinematographer, director and producer
- Sissel v. United States Department of Health & Human Services, a 2014 lawsuit challenging the Patient Protection and Affordable Care Act
- Sissela, a Swedish given name
- Cissel (disambiguation)
