= Eugene Reusser =

American football coach

Biographical details
- Born: February 14, 1922; La Junta, Colorado, U.S.
- Died: August 2, 2010 (aged 88); Wichita, Kansas, U.S.

Coaching career (HC unless noted)
- 1965–1966: Bethel (KS)

Head coaching record
- Overall: 0–18

Eugene Clayton Reusser (February 14, 1922 – August 2, 2010) was an American football coach. He was the head football coach at Bethel College in North Newton, Kansas, serving for two seasons, from 1965 to 1966, and compiling a record of 0–18.

== Head coaching record ==
=== Football ===
Year	Team	Overall	Conference	Standing	Bowl/playoffs
Bethel Graymaroons (Kansas Collegiate Athletic Conference) (1965–1966)
1965	Bethel	0–9	0–9	10th	
1966	Bethel	0–9	0–9	10th	
Bethel:		0–18	0–18		
Total:		0–18			
