= Susan Goering =

American civil rights lawyer

Susan K. Goering (born 1952) is an American civil rights lawyer, known for her litigation against segregation and other forms of institutional racism, in particular during her time at the ACLU of Maryland.

== Early life and education ==
Susan Goering was born in 1952 into a Mennonite family in North Newton, Kansas. Her family's pacifist beliefs would influence her life trajectory, and she was also inspired by watching a broadcast of Martin Luther King, Jr.'s speech during the March on Washington. Her father, Milton Goering, was a football coach, and the family lived in Ohio for a period before settling in Wichita. She studied political science and English at the University of Kansas, then graduated from law school there as well.

== Legal career ==
From early in her career, Goering focused on civil rights law, working in particular to fight discrimination against African Americans. After law school, from 1982 to 1985, she worked on a school segregation case in Missouri, Missouri v. Jenkins, that would become the final Brown v. Board of Education-style case in the United States.

In 1986, she was hired as legal director of the ACLU of Maryland. After 10 years at the civil liberties organization, she became the local executive director. The Baltimore Sun described her tenure there as defined by her "aggressive leadership," under which the organization "gained a reputation for defeating racism in some of its most subtle forms."

Goering's legal work in Maryland included successfully fighting for the closure of outdated jails with poor conditions in the state's Eastern Shore; spearheading Bradford v. Board of Education, a case that drove the state to readjust how it funded schools; and winning the landmark segregated housing lawsuit Thompson v. HUD. She has repeatedly brought litigation against the Maryland State Police, including on "Driving While Black" and spying on peaceful protesters. In addition to her influential work on racial justice, Goering also litigated for marriage equality on behalf of same-sex couples.

She retired from the ACLU in 2018, after over three decades with the organization.

== Recognition ==
In 2006, Goering was given the Robert M. Bell Award for Leadership in Public Service by the University of Baltimore. She previously received the Legal Excellence Award for the Advancement of Unpopular Causes from the Maryland Bar Foundation in 1994 and the Martin Luther King, Jr. Day of Service's Keeper of the Dream Award in 2000. In 2014, she was named to the Maryland Women's Hall of Fame.
