= Jim Paramore =

American football player, coach, and official

Biographical details
- Born: c. 1939

Playing career
- 1957–1960: Baker
- Position: Halfback

Coaching career (HC unless noted)
- 1962–1963: Linn HS (KS)
- 1964–1966: Herington HS (KS)
- 1967–1968: Dodge City
- 1972–1976: Southwestern (KS)
- 1977–1978: Bethel (KS)

Head coaching record
- Overall: 27–36 (college); 4–14–1 (junior college)

Accomplishments and honors

Awards
- Kansas Coaches and Officials Hall of Fame

James Paramore (born c. 1939) is an American former football player, coach, and official. He served as the head football coach at Southwestern College in Winfield, Kansas from 1973 to 1976 and Bethel College in Newton, Kansas from 1977 to 1978, compiling a career college football coaching record of 27–36.

== Playing career ==
Paramore played high school football in Topeka, Kansas and later in college at Baker University in Baldwin City, Kansas. While at Baker, he was one of the better players in the nation and was in the running for the Associated Press "Little All-American" status, while securing all-conference honors.

== Coaching career ==
=== Community college ===
Paramore worked his way into coaching through the community college ranks in Kansas. He was head football coach at Dodge City Community College in Dodge City, Kansas for the 1967 and 1968 seasons. At Dodge, his teams posted a losing record of 4–14–1.

=== Southwestern ===
Paramore was the 20th head football coach at Southwestern College in Winfield, Kansas and held that position five seasons, from 1972 to 1976, compiling a record of 20–25.

=== Bethel ===
After Southwestern, Paramore became the head football coach at Bethel College in Newton, Kansas for two seasons, from 1977 to 1978. For those two seasons, his teams compiled a record of 7–11.

=== High school ===
Paramore continued to coach during retirement by assisting his son, Mike, at the high school level at Perry-Lecompton High School in Perry, Kansas.

== Officiating career ==
Paramore was inducted into the Kansas Collegiate Officials Association Hall of Fame in 2002.

== Head coaching record ==
=== College ===
Year	Team	Overall	Conference	Standing	Bowl/playoffs
Southwestern Moundbuilders (Kansas Collegiate Athletic Conference) (1972–1976)
1972	Southwestern	4–5	4–4	5th	
1973	Southwestern	2–7	2–6	T–7th	
1974	Southwestern	5–4	5–3	T–2nd	
1975	Southwestern	6–3	5–3	T–2nd	
1976	Southwestern	3–6	3–5	T–6th	
Southwestern:		20–25	19–21		
Bethel Threshers (Kansas Collegiate Athletic Conference) (1977–1978)
1977	Bethel	7–2	7–1	2nd	
1978	Bethel	0–9	0–8	9th	
Bethel:		7–11	7–9		
Total:		27–36			

=== Junior college ===
Year	Team	Overall	Conference	Standing	Bowl/playoffs
Dodge City Conquistadors (Kansas Jayhawk Junior College Conference) (1967–1968)
1967	Dodge City	1–8	1–7	9th	
1968	Dodge City	3–6–1	3–4–1	T–5th	
Dodge City:		4–14–1	4–11–1		
Total:		4–14–1			

== Personal life ==
Paramore married Leilani Frey in 1960. They had 2 sons together, Marc and Mike.
