= Wes Buller =

American football coach (1928–2018)

Biographical details
- Born: October 6, 1928; Goessel, Kansas, U.S.
- Died: April 2, 2018 (aged 89); Lawrence, Kansas, U.S.

Coaching career (HC unless noted)
- 1960–1964: Bethel (KS)
- 1965–1968: Friends
- 1969–1971: Southwestern (KS)

Head coaching record
- Overall: 51–51–5

Wesley Dale Buller (October 6, 1928 – April 2, 2018) was an American football coach. He served as the head football coach at Bethel College in Newton, Kansas (1960–1964), Friends University in Wichita, Kansas (1965–1968), and Southwestern College in Winfield, Kansas (1969–1971), compiling a career college football record of 51–51–5.

== Coaching career ==
=== Bethel ===
Buller was the head football coach at Bethel College in Newton, Kansas for five seasons, from 1960 until 1964, compiling a record of 17–26–2.

=== Friends ===
After Bethel, Buller became the head football coach at Friends University in Wichita, Kansas, serving from 1965 to 1968 season, during which time his program recorded a record of 19–15–2.

=== Southwestern ===
Buller was the 19th head football coach at Southwestern College in Winfield, Kansas, serving for three seasons, from 1969 to 1971. His record at Southwestern was 15–11–1.

Buller resigned as head coach after the death of his wife in 1971.

== Head coaching record ==
Year	Team	Overall	Conference	Standing	Bowl/playoffs
Bethel Threshers (Kansas Collegiate Athletic Conference) (1960–1964)
1960	Bethel	4–4–1	4–4–1	T–5th	
1961	Bethel	3–6	3–6	T–7th	
1962	Bethel	4–4–1	4–4–1	5th	
1963	Bethel	4–5	4–5	6th	
1964	Bethel	2–7	2–7	T–8th	
Bethel:		17–26–2	17–26–2		
Friends Falcons (Kansas Collegiate Athletic Conference) (1965–1968)
1965	Friends	4–5	4–5	6th	
1966	Friends	5–3–1	5–3–1	T–4th	
1967	Friends	4–4–1	4–4–1	6th	
1968	Friends	6–3	6–3	3rd	
Friends:		19–15–2	19–15–2		
Southwestern Moundbuilders (Kansas Collegiate Athletic Conference) (1969–1971)
1969	Southwestern	6–3	3–2	T–2nd (South)	
1970	Southwestern	5–3–1	3–2	T–2nd (South)	
1971	Southwestern	4–5	3–5	T–5th	
Southwestern:		15–11–1	9–9		
Total:		51–51–5			
