= Otto D. Unruh =

American football player and coach

Biographical details
- Born: September 17, 1899
- Died: May 19, 1992 (aged 92); Newton, Kansas, U.S.

Coaching career (HC unless noted)

Football
- 1929–1942: Bethel (KS)
- 1945–1966: Clay Center Comm. HS (KS)
- 1967–1969: Bethel (KS)

Head coaching record
- Overall: 53–76–6 (college football); 126–65–8 (high school football)

Otto Dean Unruh (September 17, 1899 – May 19, 1992) was an American football player and coach. In 1960, Unruh wrote the book How To Coach Winning Football and is credited with inventing the T-Wing offensive football formation, having run the play as early as 1938. He is a member of the Kansas Sports Hall of Fame.

== Playing career ==
Unruh played one season of basketball for the Kansas Jayhawks under head coach Phog Allen before his graduation in 1926.

== Coaching career ==
=== Bethel College ===
Unruh was the head football coach at Bethel College in North Newton, Kansas. He held that position for 17 seasons, from 1929 until 1942 and again from 1967 through 1969. His coaching record at Bethel was 53–76–6. Bethel College honored his legacy by inducting him into the schools athletic hall of fame.

=== High school ===
In between his two times as head coach at Bethel, Unruh was a high school teacher at Clay Center Community High School in Clay Center, Kansas. While teaching high school he was coach of both football and track teams and the high school stadium bears his name. In 2004, the school added him to their "Hall of Fame" for his accomplishments.

== Head coaching record ==
=== College football ===
Year	Team	Overall	Conference	Standing	Bowl/playoffs
Bethel Graymaroons (Independent) (1929–1938)
1929	Bethel	0–8			
1930	Bethel	2–8			
1931	Bethel	0–6–1			
1932	Bethel	1–5			
1933	Bethel	4–2–1			
1934	Bethel	8–1			
1935	Bethel	4–1–2			
1936	Bethel	4–4			
1937	Bethel	4–3			
1938	Bethel	5–3			
Bethel Graymaroons (Kansas Collegiate Athletic Conference) (1939–1942)
1939	Bethel	3–5–1	1–4–1	7th	
1940	Bethel	4–6	1–5	7th	
1941	Bethel	6–1–1	4–1–1	T–2nd	
1942	Bethel	2–6–1	0–6	7th	
Bethel Threshers (Kansas Collegiate Athletic Conference) (1967–1969)
1967	Bethel	1–8	1–8	9th	
1968	Bethel	3–6	3–6	T–7th	
1969	Bethel	4–5	2–3	4th (South)	
Bethel:		53–76–6	12–33–2		
Total:		53–76–6			
