= Daniel Hege =

American orchestral conductor

Daniel Hege is an American orchestral conductor. He is currently the music director of the Wichita Symphony Orchestra and the Binghamton Philharmonic. Hege previously served as the music director of the former Syracuse Symphony Orchestra. He also makes numerous guest appearances with orchestras and music festivals across the country.

== Biography ==
Hege was born in Colorado and raised in Idaho to parents Carl and Anne, who he names as his role models. He attended the First Mennonite Church in Aberdeen, Idaho. He began piano lessons at the age of nine and realized at that age that music would be his ruling passion.

He has majors in history and music at Bethel College, graduating in 1987. His senior seminar paper was about how the composer Dmitri Shostakovich worked under the repressive Stalin regime in Russia in the mid-20th century. He went on to obtain a master's degree from the University of Utah in orchestral conducting, where he founded the University Chamber Orchestra. He studied at the University of Southern California with Daniel Lewis and at the Aspen Music Festival with Paul Vermel.

In 2004 Mr. Hege received an honorary doctorate in Humane Letters from Le Moyne College.

He is active as a guest clinician and adjudicates various musical competitions nationally.

He has three daughters and one son, and lives in Cleveland, OH.

== Positions held ==
- Music Director of the Wichita Symphony Orchestra (September 2010 – present)
- Music Director of the Binghamton Philharmonic (May 2018 – present)
- Principal Guest Conductor of the Tulsa Symphony Orchestra (September 2015 – May 2022)
- Music Director of the Syracuse Symphony Orchestra (April 1999 – April 2011)
- Music Director of the Haddonfield Symphony, New Jersey (1997 - 2000) (Now known as Symphony in C)
- Music Director of the Encore Chamber Orchestra in Chicago (1993 - 1997)
- Music Director of the Chicago Youth Symphony (1993 - 1997) (was honored twice by the American Symphony Orchestra League for innovative programming while in this position)
- Associate Conductor of the Kansas City Symphony (1995 - 1996)
- Assistant, Associate and Resident Conductor of the Baltimore Symphony (1996–2001)
- Music Director and Principal Conductor of the Young Musicians’ Foundation Debut Orchestra in Los Angeles (1990 - 1993)
- Music Director of the Newton Mid-Kansas Symphony Orchestra (1993 - 2004)
- Director of Instrumental Music at the Orange County High School of the Arts (1991 - 1993)
- Assistant Conductor of the Pacific Symphony (1991 - 1993)

== Guest conductor roles ==
Maestro Hege has performed or will perform as guest conductor for the following orchestras and festivals:

- Akron Symphony Orchestra
- Albany Symphony Orchestra
- Amarillo Symphony Orchestra
- Annapolis Symphony Orchestra
- Aspen Music Festival
- Auckland Philharmonia Orchestra, New Zealand
- Baltimore Chamber Orchestra
- Baltimore Symphony Orchestra
- Bardi Symphony Orchestra of Leicester, England
- Binghamton Philharmonic Orchestra
- Boise Phil
- Brevard Music Center Summer Institute
- Buffalo Philharmonic Orchestra
- Calgary Philharmonic Orchestra, Canada
- Charleston Symphony Orchestra
- Charlotte Symphony Orchestra
- Civic Orchestra of Chicago
- Columbus Symphony Orchestra
- Colorado Symphony Orchestra
- Colorado Springs Philharmonic
- Dayton Philharmonic Orchestra
- Detroit Symphony Orchestra
- Edmonton Symphony Orchestra
- Elgin Symphony Orchestra
- Eugene Symphony
- Florida Orchestra
- Grand Rapids Symphony
- Grand Teton Music Festival
- Grant Park Music Festival
- Hartford Symphony Orchestra
- Houston Symphony Orchestra
- Illinois Symphony Orchestra
- Indianapolis Symphony Orchestra
- Kalamazoo Symphony Orchestra
- Kansas City Symphony
- Lake Placid Sinfonietta
- Los Angeles Mozart Orchestra
- Louisiana Philharmonic Orchestra
- Louisville Orchestra
- Madison Symphony Orchestra
- Memphis Symphony Orchestra
- Music Academy of the West
- Naples Philharmonic Orchestra
- National Orchestral Institute
- National Philharmonic at Strathmore
- National Repertory Orchestra
- North Carolina Symphony Orchestra
- OK Mozart International Festival
- Olympia Philharmonic
- Omaha Symphony Orchestra
- Oregon Symphony Orchestra
- Orlando Philharmonic Orchestra
- Orquesta Sinfónico Nacional de Costa Rica
- Pacific Symphony Orchestra
- Phoenix Symphony Orchestra
- Puerto Rico Symphony Orchestra
- Rhode Island Philharmonic Orchestra
- Rochester Philharmonic Orchestra
- San Antonio Symphony Orchestra
- San Diego Symphony
- Santa Barbara Symphony Orchestra
- Santa Rosa Symphony
- Sarasota Orchestra
- Seattle Symphony Orchestra
- Singapore Symphony Orchestra
- Skaneateles Music Festival
- Spokane Symphony
- St. Petersburg Symphony Orchestra, Russia
- Stamford Symphony Orchestra
- Symphony Orchestra of Lima, Peru
- Syracuse Opera
- Texas Music Festival
- Toledo Symphony Orchestra
- Tulsa Symphony Orchestra
- Tucson Symphony Orchestra
- Virginia Symphony Orchestra
- Wintergreen Summer Music Festival

== Recordings ==
- Texas Music Festival, 2014, Nielsen: Symphony No. 4, Britten: Sinfonia da Requiem, Bartok: Miraculous Mandarin Suite, Blu-ray Disc Release.
- SSO Big Band Bash, 2006.
- Serenity Cedille, 2006, Label: Cedille
- SSO Holiday Pops, 2002.
- SSO Classics Concert, 2000.
- Violin Concertos by Black Composers of the 18th & 19th Centuries, 1999, Label: Cedille, with violinist Rachel Barton Pine and the Encore Chamber Orchestra (which was nominated for a 1998 NPR Heritage Award).
- Done Made My Vow, works of Adolphus Hailstork performed with the Baltimore Symphony Orchestra and Morgan State Choir.
- The Gift, Label: Woodland Records, with oboist Brad Smith.
