= Reusser =

Reusser is a surname. Notable people with the surname include:

- Eugene Reusser (1922–2010), American football coach
- Francis Reusser (1942–2020), Swiss film director
- Kenneth L. Reusser (1920–2009), United States Marine Corps aviator
- Marlen Reusser (born 1991), Swiss cyclist
