= Health in a Fragile State: Science, Sorcery, and Spirit in the Lower Congo =

2019 book by John M. Janzen

- Author: John M. Janzen
- Series: Africa and the Diaspora: History, Politics, Culture
- Subject: Medical anthropology, public health, Democratic Republic of the Congo
- Genre: Non-fiction
- Publisher: University of Wisconsin Press
- Publication date: 2019
- Media type: Print (hardcover, paperback), e-book
- Pages: 288
- ISBN: 978-0-299-32500-8 (hardcover)
- OCLC: 1089553825

Health in a Fragile State: Science, Sorcery, and Spirit in the Lower Congo is a 2019 book by American medical anthropologist John M. Janzen. It was published by the University of Wisconsin Press as part of the Africa and the Diaspora: History, Politics, Culture series. Janzen examines public health and health care in the Manianga region of the Lower Congo after the collapse of the Zairian/Congolese state in the 1980s and 1990s. Based on fieldwork conducted in 2013 and on research dating back to the 1960s, he investigates the role of the churches, universities, NGOs, local governments, and other institutions that assumed responsibility for health services after the withdrawal of the central state, and assesses how their varying degrees of social legitimacy affected their capacity to address endemic diseases such as malaria, sleeping sickness, and severe diarrhea. The author integrates historical demography, household economics, Kongo ritual and political thought, and epidemiological data from the Luozi Territory's health zones.

== Author and background ==
According to Janzen, the project originated as a follow-up to his anthropological fieldwork in the Manianga region of the Lower Congo conducted between 1964 and 1969, which was the basis for his 1978 publication The Quest for Therapy in Lower Zaire. Motivated by an interest in the changes to health and healing systems during the postcolonial period (specifically from the mid-1960s to the 2010s), he returned to the region for four months of field research in 2013. The project was funded by a Fulbright Senior Research Fellowship and facilitated by Congolese historian Professor Kimpianga Mahaniah, Rector of the Luozi Free University, who acted as the author's counterpart host.

Upon arriving, Janzen noticed that the centralized state apparatus he had studied previously had largely collapsed; the national Ministry of Health was effectively invisible, and state officials were frequently absent due to unpaid salaries. In its place, he found a constellation of "Health Zones" administered primarily by Protestant and Catholic church agencies which functioned as the primary umbrella organizations for public health. To conceptualize how these non-state institutions maintained authority and delivered services without government funding, Janzen used social scientific legitimation theory, a framework he further researched during a 2014 residency at the Max Planck Institute for Social Anthropology in Germany. Due to the fragmentation of official data sources, he supplemented government annual reports and other public sources by constructing his own "intensive sample" survey to gather local health data.

== Summary ==
Janzen studies the legitimation of power and knowledge in public health and health care in the Manianga region of the Lower Congo, situated north of the Congo River between Kinshasa and the Atlantic coast. He documents how the collapse of the Zairian/Congolese state during the 1980s and 1990s affected the capacity of institutions to address endemic diseases (including malaria, severe respiratory infections, severe childhood diarrhea, bilharzia, trypanosomiasis, tuberculosis, HIV/AIDS, typhoid, and seasonal flu) and how an array of alternative institutions emerged to fill the vacuum left by the withdrawal of centralized government services. Janzen's thesis is that a fragile state produces fragile health, while legitimate and well-supported institutions empower communities to deal more effectively with disease.

The book is organized in three parts. Janzen covers the history of population and disease in the Lower Congo. He traces demographic and epidemiological changes from the precolonial mercantile and slave-trading era through the Congo Free State period (1885–1908), Belgian colonialism (1908–1960), and into the postcolonial decades. Janzen documents a dramatic population decline (estimated at up to fifty percent) during the centuries of the Atlantic slave trade and the early colonial period, driven by forced labor, population displacement, and outbreaks of sleeping sickness, malaria, dysentery, and other diseases. He uses colonial census records, Swedish mission medical surveys from the 1930s, and territorial archives to establish a demographic baseline, showing that population recovery began around 1930 and continued through independence, with a near doubling in the postcolonial period. Janzen also reviews postcolonial trends, including the emergence of family planning among younger women, the eradication or near-elimination of diseases such as smallpox, polio, and leprosy, and how malaria and other diseases persisted. Janzen recounts a 2007 trypanosomiasis outbreak and illustrates both the effectiveness of public health interventions and the ways historical memory and fears of sorcery shape popular responses to disease.

In the second part, Janzen examines the social reproduction of health: the ways in which households, families, clans, and public institutions sustain health. In one chapter, he analyzes North Kongo social and economic organization, and focuses on the household as the primary unit of production and the split between matrilineal clan land tenure and urban individual property ownership. In a case study of one farming couple's annual production cycle, he shows the balance between subsistence cultivation and the cash economy, and how health care costs can overwhelm household budgets in the absence of insurance or public financing. Janzen traces how public health institutions were reorganized after the state's withdrawal. He describes the origins and spread of the health zone system—initially developed as prototypes at several Congolese hospitals and later adopted nationally in coordination with the World Health Organization's primary health care initiative. The chapter details how Protestant and Catholic church medical departments assumed administrative responsibility for health zones, hospitals, and clinics, and how international NGOs, the national coordinating body Santé Rurale du Congo (SANRU), local government, private pharmacies, and an innovative pharmaceutical research center all contributed to a patchwork of health services. The installation of Luozi's waterworks in 1993, accomplished through the mobilization of regional elites and national resources on the eve of the state's collapse, is an example of a public health project driven by local initiative. Another chapter explores popular meanings of health as expressed by respondents in the study's household survey, with answers ranging from the strength to work, bodily purity and cleanliness, rejoicing in one's body, and quality of life, to frustrations over the high cost of medical care and the perceived abandonment by the state.

In the third part, Janzen focuses on the legitimation of power and knowledge. He discusses theories of social legitimacy (based on both Western scholarship and Kongo political thought) and introduces the ritual of dumuna, a vigorous leaping handshake signifying transcendent contact and the restoration of legitimate authority. He presents dumuna in various settings: in the work of traditional healers, in blessings to repair interclan alliances, in the inauguration of chiefs where sickness in the candidate is understood as a calling and investiture as social healing, and in the weighing-of-the-spirit rite practiced by contemporary prophetic churches. He examines scientific and spiritual knowledge in Kongo society, and how evolutionary biology and genetics have entered popular and professional understanding through the experience of malaria and sickle cell anemia. Ecological and mystical explanations coexist in accounts of crocodile attacks on the Congo River, and the divination to investigate the relational causes of misfortune persists alongside biomedical diagnosis.

== 2023 conference ==
In September 2023, Janzen delivered the keynote address at the Conference on Decolonizing Medicine in Africa and the Diaspora, held at Towson University in Baltimore, Maryland, and organized by historians Jonathan Roberts and Oluwatoyin Oduntan. In his address, Janzen used three case studies (the spread of genetic knowledge about sickle cell anemia in the Lower Congo, the containment of an Ebola outbreak at Lacor Hospital in Gulu, Uganda, in 2000, and the role of local health networks in the 2008 WHO polio eradication campaign) to argue that effective disease control depends on legitimate institutions, trained personnel, and the integration of scientific knowledge into local epistemologies. He connected these cases to the framework of institutional legitimacy developed in the book and posed the question of what constitutes the "coloniality" that persists in African medicine despite the availability of modern treatments and public health measures.
