= Sissela =

Sissela is a given name. Notable people with the name include:

- Sissela Bok (born 1934), Swedish-born philosopher and ethicist
- Sissela Benn (born 1980) Swedish actress and comedian
- Sissela Kyle (born 1957), Swedish actress and comedian
- Sissela Nordling Blanco (born 1988), Swedish politician

== See also ==
- Cisséla, a town in Guinea
- Sissel, a Norwegian given name
