= John M. Janzen =

American anthropologist

Janzen (far left) at Izirangabo refugee camp

John M. Janzen (born October 28, 1937) is Professor Emeritus of Anthropology at the University of Kansas. His research focuses on health, illness, and healing practices in Southern and Central Africa.

== Biography ==
John M. Janzen was born to Hilda Gertrude Neufeldt and Louis Abraham Janzen on October 28, 1937, in Newton, Kansas. He is the second of four children, and one of three boys in his family. He is married to Reinhild Kauenhoven and has three children.

After graduating from high school at Berean Academy, he attended Bethel College for four years. He met his future wife, Reinhild Kauenhoven, a fellow student from Goettingen, Germany. After his second year in school, Janzen joined the PAX program of the Mennonite Central Committee where he served for two years as an alternative to U.S. military service. During this time, Janzen worked on projects involving education, and helped in the construction of a hospital in the late colonial setting of the South Savannah of Belgian Congo. Returning home, Janzen pursued a graduate degree in anthropology. He graduated from Bethel College in 1961 with a bachelor's degree in Social Science and Philosophy, and was accepted at the University of Chicago as a graduate student in anthropology.

After a first year taking core anthropology courses at Chicago, Janzen received a French Government grant to attend the University of Paris (Sorbonne), where he received a certificate of African Studies in 1963. He then shifted his focus to North Africa and the Middle East, enrolling in a program in Arabic and Islamic Culture with Mushin Madhi of the Oriental Institute at the University of Chicago. Janzen received an M.A. in anthropology from the University of Chicago in May 1964, and began his PhD studies there soon after. He married Kauenhoven the same year.

Between 1964 and 1966, Janzen conducted fieldwork in the lower Congo region, examining the social and political organization, economic development, religion, health, and patterns of healthcare seeking among the Kongo people. His research employed a historical perspective, using the pre-colonial, colonial, and post-colonial mercantile trade of the 16th to late 19th centuries to illustrate its influence on Kongo perceptions of health, suffering, and healing from the 17th to the early 20th centuries. Janzen returned home in 1966 to complete his dissertation, titled Elemental Categories, Symbols, and Ideas of Association in Kongo-Manianga Society. He received his PhD from the University of Chicago in June 1967.

== Professional life ==
Janzen returned to Newton, Kansas and began teaching as an assistant professor at Bethel College from 1967 to 1968. In 1969 he received a Social Science Research Council Post-Doctoral Fellowship and returned to the lower Congo/Zaire region to complete a study on Kongo therapeutics. He began teaching as an assistant professor at McGill University in Montreal in late 1969. There, he was introduced to semiotics. He explored connections between materiality, ideas, and symbols, and studied the work of Victor Turner and Roland Barthes.

In summer 1970, Janzen spent a month in Sweden working on Lower Congo archival materials. He returned to his teaching position at McGill and remained there until 1972, when he accepted a position as associate professor in socio-cultural anthropology and African studies at the University of Kansas. In 1974, Janzen and Wyatt MacGaffey published An Anthology of Kongo Religion: Primary Texts from Lower Zaire (KU Publications in Anthropology 1974).

At the University of Kansas, Janzen published The Quest for Therapy in Lower Zaire (California, 1978), reissued in paperback as The Quest for Therapy: Medical Pluralism in Lower Zaire (1982) and in French translation as La quête de la thérapie au Bas-Zaïre (Karthala, 1995). This work, based on his Social Science Research Council Post-Doctoral Fellowship and a two-year seminar at McGill, examined Equatorial African approaches to sickness and healing, comparing African and Western-derived biomedical therapies. It received the Wellcome Medal and Award from the Royal Anthropological Institute of Great Britain and Ireland. He later became editor of the Comparative Studies of Health Systems and Medical Care journal.

Janzen received an Alexander von Humboldt Fellowship to study the Western Equatorial African historic Lemba cult in Western European museums. His research, resulting in the book Lemba (1650–1930): A Drum of Affliction in Africa and the new World (1982), described the Lemba as a cult emphasizing alliance building through marriage, trade, and healing. He identified the Lemba's sickness as stemming from subordinates' envy of the mercantile elite's wealth. The "drum of affliction" paradigm, a translation of the proto and pan-Bantu word ngoma, was further explored in his work on Central and Southern Africa, facilitated by a lectureship at the University of Cape Town. This research culminated in Ngoma: Discourses of Healing in Central and Southern Africa (1992). He also traced Kongo culture to the New World.

In 1991, Janzen and his wife co-authored Mennonite Furniture: A Migrant Tradition 1766-1910, a catalogue for a museum exhibit. His involvement in Mennonite history stemmed from a 1989 sabbatical tracing the tradition from the Netherlands to the Baltic Seacoast.

In 1994–1995, Janzen conducted research in the post-genocide Great Lakes Region of Rwanda, Burundi, and eastern Zaire/Congo, resulting in Do I Still have a Life? Voices from the Aftermath of War in Rwanda and Burundi (2001), a comparison of the actions of ordinary people and leaders in several communes before and after the war and genocide.

His work at the University of Kansas focused on African Medical Anthropology, including war, trauma, healing, semiotics, socio-cultural anthropology, and medical anthropology. This period included the publication of The Social Fabric of Health: An Introduction to Medical Anthropology (2002).

In 2013, Janzen conducted research on postcolonial health in the Lower Congo, supported by the IIE-Fulbright Program. He and his wife spent four months in Luozi, facilitated by the Free University of Luozi and its rector, Dr. Kimpianga Mahaniah. Further analysis, including a 2014 residency at the University of Halle-Wittenberg and the Max Planck Institute for Social Anthropology, informed his monograph Health in a Fragile State: Science, Sorcery, and Spirit in the Lower Congo (Madison, WI: University of Wisconsin Press, 2019).

== Publications ==
=== Books ===
- 1974: Anthology of Kongo Religion: Primary Texts from Lower Zaire. KU Publ. in Anthropology # 5, Lawrence. 163 pp. (with Wyatt MacGaffey)
- 1978: The Quest for Therapy in Lower Zaire. Berkeley & London. University of California Press, 267 pp. (with collab. Wm. Arkinstall) Paperback edition, 1982.
- 1979: The Social History of Disease and Medicine in Africa. Special Issue: Social Science and Medicine 13B, 268 pp., (with Steven Feierman)
- 1980: The Development of Health. Akron, Pa., Mennonite Central Committee (Development Monograph 8), March., 32 pp.
- 1981: Causality and Classification in African Medicine and Health. Special Issue: Social Science and Medicine, 15B,3, 268 pp. (with Gwyn Prins)
- 1982: Lemba (1650–1930): A Drum of Affliction in Africa and the new World. New York, Garland Publ., 383 pp.
- 1991: Mennonite Furniture: A Migrant Tradition 1766–1910. Intercourse, PA: Good Books.
- 1992: The Social Basis of Health and Healing in Africa, ed. with Steve Feierman, University of California Press.
- 1992: Ngoma: Discourses of Healing in Central and Southern Africa. University of California Press.
- 1995: Quête de la Guérison dans le Bas-Zaïre. Paris: Karthala.
- 1999: The Architecture of Anabaptist-Mennonite Spaces and Places of Meeting and Worship. Proceedings of an International Conference October 16–18, 1997, Harleysville PA. Special Issue of Mennonite Quarterly Review, April. (Editor with David Rempel-Smucker).
- 2000: Do I still have a life? Voices from the aftermath of war in Rwanda and Burundi, 1994-1995. "KU Monographs" in Anthropology #20. With Reinhild Janzen.
- 2001: The Social Fabric of Health: An Introduction to Medical Anthropology. New York: McGraw-Hill.
- 2008: Global Medical Anthropology in the U.S. Heartland. Editor, Special issue, Viennese Ethnomedicine Newsletter, Feb. & June (2&3).
- 2009: A Carved Loango Tlusk: Local Images and Global Connections. KU Monographs in Anthropology 24.
- 2014: Medical Anthropology in Global Africa. Eds. Kathryn Rhine, J.M.Janzen, Glenn Adams, Heather Aldersey. KU Publications in Anthropology 26.
- 2019: Health in a Fragile State: Science, Sorcery, and Spirit in the Lower Congo. Madison: University of Wisconsin Press.
