= Wichita Symphony Orchestra =

The Wichita Symphony Orchestra (WSO) is the oldest professional symphony orchestra in Kansas, performing out of Century II Concert Hall in downtown Wichita. It was founded in 1944.

The orchestra's annual activities include an 8-concert Masterworks series, Pops concerts and free, citywide presentations.

== Leadership ==
- Tim Storhoff, executive director
- Daniel Hege, music director and conductor
- Ryan Beeken, chorus director
- Maya Grossman, director of youth orchestras program
- Dr. Timothy Shade, youth symphony conductor
- Frances Oare, repertory orchestra conductor
- Catherine Tummons, youth chamber players
- Bryan Kirk, youth wind ensemble conductor
- Madeline Crawford, introductory string orchestra conductor
- Erik Cooke-Stone, youth concert band

== Educational activities ==
=== Young People's Concerts ===
Young People's Concerts (YPCs) are performed for area third through eighth grade students every fall and winter, reaching approximately 24,000 students and their teachers each year. These 40-minute programs feature the full Wichita Symphony Orchestra and often utilize actors or dancers to illustrate the program.

=== Wichita Symphony Youth Orchestras ===
Founded in 1947, WSYO's Youth Symphony is a charter member of the Youth Symphony Orchestra Division of the League of American Orchestras. Today, the Wichita Symphony Youth Orchestras Program is made up of six ensembles that serve over 300 students from 22 cities and towns in central Kansas. WSYO ensembles include the youth symphony, repertory orchestra, youth chamber players, introductory string orchestra, wind ensemble and youth concert band.

In 2018, The Wichita Symphony Youth Orchestras commissioned WSYO alumni, Logan Nelson, to perform his orchestra piece on their spring concert on March 2, 2019, as well as their concert with the Colorado Springs Youth Symphony on March 10, 2019.

=== Kinderconcerts ===
The Bloomfield String Quartet, composed of four Wichita State University graduate student musicians from the Wichita Symphony, perform free in-school concerts at Wichita public elementary schools each year, known as KinderConcerts. The programme is aimed at Kindergarten to second-grade students, and the purpose is to introduce children to classical music, serving as an introduction to the basics of music.

== Milestones ==
- 1944 Wichita Symphony Orchestra founded
- 1946 Wichita Symphony Youth Orchestras (WSYO) formed
- 1946 Women's Association of the Wichita Symphony (WAWS) formed
- 1969 Wichita Symphony moves from East High School Auditorium to Century II Performing Arts Center
- 1978 Wichita Symphony Orchestra Chorus formed
- 1979 WAWS presents the first Symphony Showhouse in support of the Wichita Symphony
- 1981 Wichita Symphony presents first free Family Holiday Concert

== Conductors ==
- Orien Dally (1944)
- James Robertson (1950)
- Francois Huybrechts (1972)
- Michael Palmer (1977)
- Zuohuang Chen (1990)
- Andrew Sewell (2000)
- Daniel Hege (2010–present)
