= Jacob A. Schowalter =

American politician

Jacob Abraham Schowalter (August 25, 1879 – March 10, 1953) was a Kansas farmer, business owner and Mennonite philanthropist whose estate formed the basis of the Schowalter Foundation.

Schowalter was born in Friedelsheim in the Palatinate province of Germany. He came to North American with his family in 1883, and with the help of Mennonite relatives, settled near Halstead, Kansas. Schowalter joined Halstead Mennonite Church in 1894. He attended Bethel College and later Kansas State Agricultural College at Manhattan, Kansas.

Schowalter's father died in 1885 and his mother in 1890. He received his share of the estate in 1903, 80 acres (320,000 m^{2}) of the family farm near Halstead and purchased an additional 80 acres (320,000 m^{2}) from a sibling. This was the start of the real estate fortune that Schowalter would build over his lifetime. In 1917 he purchased 320 acres (1.3 km^{2}) near Newton, Kansas where he made his permanent residence. On the Newton farm, Schowalter started raising livestock, keeping up to a thousand sheep and 150 cattle.

As a blacksmith, Schowalter was able to improve and repair his farm equipment. He patented an adjustable cultivator (1904) and a portable hoist (1921). In 1923 he formed a partnership to own and operate a grain elevator, in part to market his own substantial wheat crop. Later he took over full ownership of the elevator.

During World War I wheat farming was profitable and Schowalter invested his earnings in stocks and bonds. When land prices fell during the Great Depression Schowalter was able to buy vast tracts of western Kansas and Oklahoma farmland from farmers eager to sell. Schowalter had earlier observed summer fallowing in eastern Oregon and applied it to his advantage, perhaps the first to introduce this practice to Kansas. From 1935 to 1950 good crop yields, high commodity prices and increasing land values all helped to build the Schowalter estate.

By 1950 Schowalter owned property in Harvey, Sedgwick, Butler, Scott, Sherman and Stevens counties. A significant portion of this laid over the Hugoton natural gas field and some of his 400 acres (1.6 km^{2}) in Oklahoma produced oil income.

Schowalter, a Democratic Party member, felt Mennonites should be more engaged in the political process and the problems of government. He served two terms (1934–1938) as a Kansas state representative.

Schowalter never married and lived a simple, austere life. His success was based on hard work, saving and common sense investments. Schowalter gave to charitable causes that were compatible to his Mennonite faith. He supported mission work, world relief efforts, education and church institutions. In 1952 Schowalter was a key donor involved in purchasing over 30,000 acres (120 km²) of land in Paraguay to aid resettlement of European Mennonite refugees displaced by World War II.

Schowalter died in 1953, leaving an estate of $1.57 million which became the basis for the Schowalter Foundation, a charitable organization that continues to support numerous Mennonite projects.
