= Jewish rye bread =

Bread commonly used in Jewish deli sandwiches

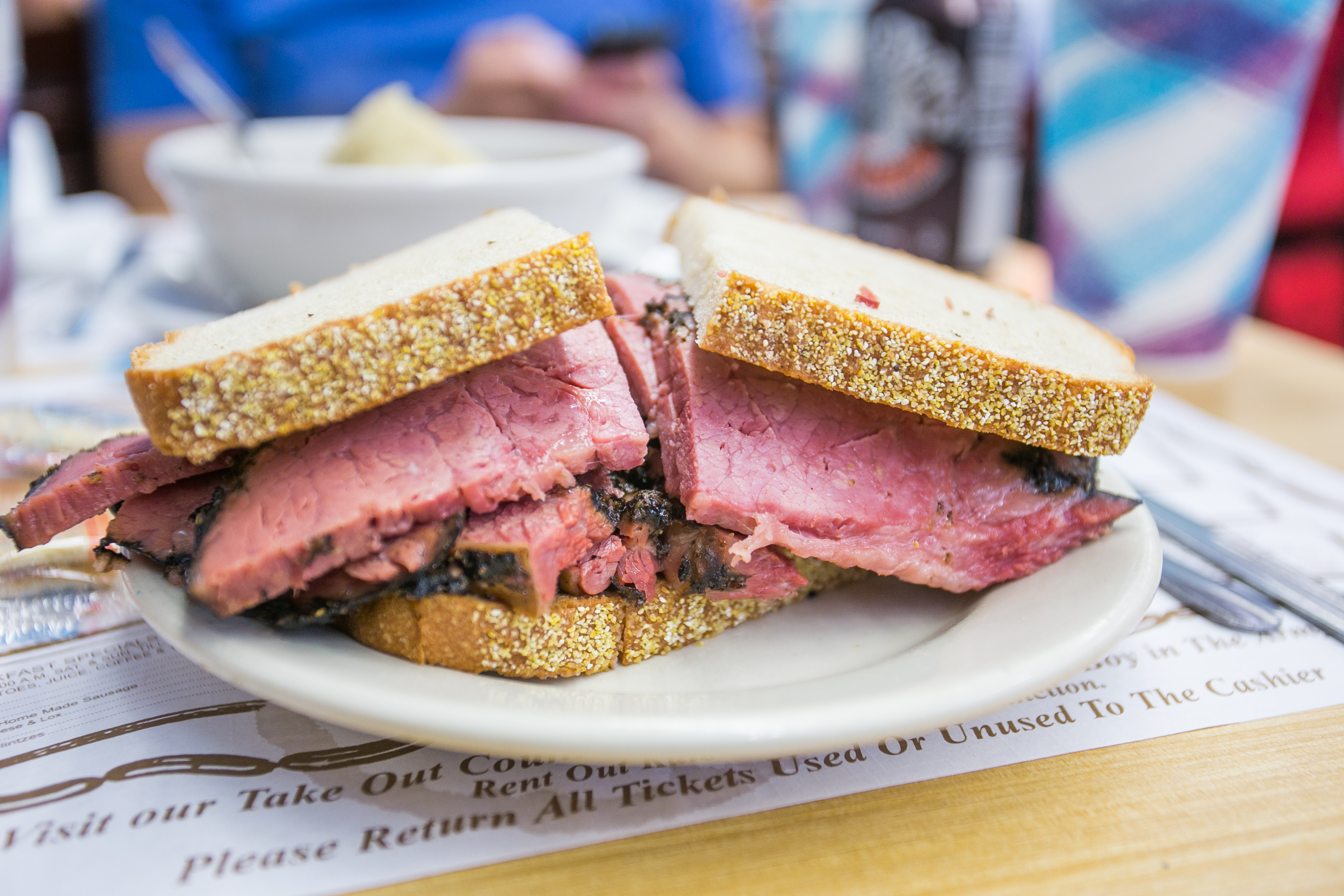
- A pastrami on rye sandwich from Katz’s Deli in New York City, made with Jewish rye bread
- Alternative names: New York rye bread, Jewish-style rye bread, Sissel bread, Cissel bread, double-baked rye bread
- Type: Bread
- Course: Appetizer or main
- Place of origin: Jewish communities of Central and Eastern Europe, Scandinavia, Canada, the United States
- Created by: Ashkenazi Jews
- Main ingredients: Wheat flour, rye flour, water, yeast, caraway seeds (optional), egg wash, salt

Jewish rye bread is a type of rye bread commonly made in Jewish communities. Due to the diaspora of the Jews, there are several geographical variations of the bread. The bread is sometimes called sissel bread or cissel bread, as sissel means caraway seed in Yiddish.

== Israel ==
In Israel, rye bread is very popular due to the large Jewish population of Ashkenazi Jewish descent. It has become popular with Sephardic and Mizrahi Jews as well. It is also commonly used in restaurant kitchens and is a staple at many bakeries. It can be found in virtually every bakery and grocery store in Israel. The mass-produced version is very similar to the American; however, it is often very soft. Many bakeries in restaurants in places such as Tel Aviv and Jerusalem are redefining rye bread and are baking their own versions that are sometimes a twist on the traditional Jewish rye bread, and sometimes harken back to the most traditional Ashkenazi-style rye bread.

== United States ==
In the United States wheat-rye bread, including light rye (sissel), American pumpernickel, and the combination of the two as marble rye, is closely associated with Jewish cuisine and Jewish-American cuisine, particularly the delicatessen. The bulk of the flour is white wheat flour (often a less-refined form known as first clear), with a substantial portion of rye mixed in for color and flavor. The dough is often leavened, in whole or in part, with sourdough, but sometimes uses a small addition of citric acid or vinegar to achieve the lowered pH needed to neutralize the rye amylases. The so-called Jewish rye is further seasoned with whole caraway fruits and glazed with an egg wash, and is traditionally associated with salted meats, such as corned beef and pastrami.

High-gluten wheat flour can be used with rye flour to make a dough suitable for bagels. Jewish-style American rye bread is sometimes referred to as corn rye, possibly from the Yiddish korn ('grain'), or from the use of cornmeal as a coating and handling aid.

The Jewish-American variety has Eastern European Jewish antecedents, including Russian Jewish style brown bread, Polish Jewish style rye bread, and Latvian Jewish style rye bread.

== Canada ==
In Canada, several different types of Jewish rye bread are available. Breads containing caraway seeds often referred to as "kimmel bread" (from the Yiddish word קימל, cf. German Kümmel). There are mass-produced, prepackaged brands such as Oroweat. In communities with significant Jewish populations, such as Montreal, Toronto, Winnipeg, and Vancouver, authentic Ashkenazi Jewish-style rye bread is available at many kosher and kosher-style bakeries, delis, restaurants, and kosher grocery stores.

There is also Winnipeg-style rye bread, which does not contain much, if any, rye flour. Instead, this Jewish-influenced bread is made from cracked or coarse rye meal, added to wheat flour. Winnipeg-style rye bread does not contain caraway seeds.

== See also ==
- List of breads
