= Schowalter Foundation =

American foundation

- Formation: 1954
- Type: Philanthropic foundation
- Headquarters: Newton, KS, United States
- Revenue: $1,165,674 (2015)
- Expenses: $1,569,903 (2015)
- Website: schowalterfoundation.org

The Schowalter Foundation is a Kansas-based Mennonite philanthropic foundation formed in 1954 from the estate of Jacob A. Schowalter of Newton, Kansas.

Initially funded with an estate of $1,157,000, the foundation's assets reached $10,298,000 in 2003 ranking among the top thirty Kansas foundations. Income from the foundation's assets are used for relief work, training of missionaries and ministers and promotion of peace. Grants totaled $425,950 in 2003.

The foundation was originally overseen by two representatives from each of the large Kansas Mennonite denominations: General Conference Mennonite Church, (Old) Mennonite Church and Church of God in Christ, Mennonite.
