= North Newton, Kansas =

City in Harvey County, Kansas

- City
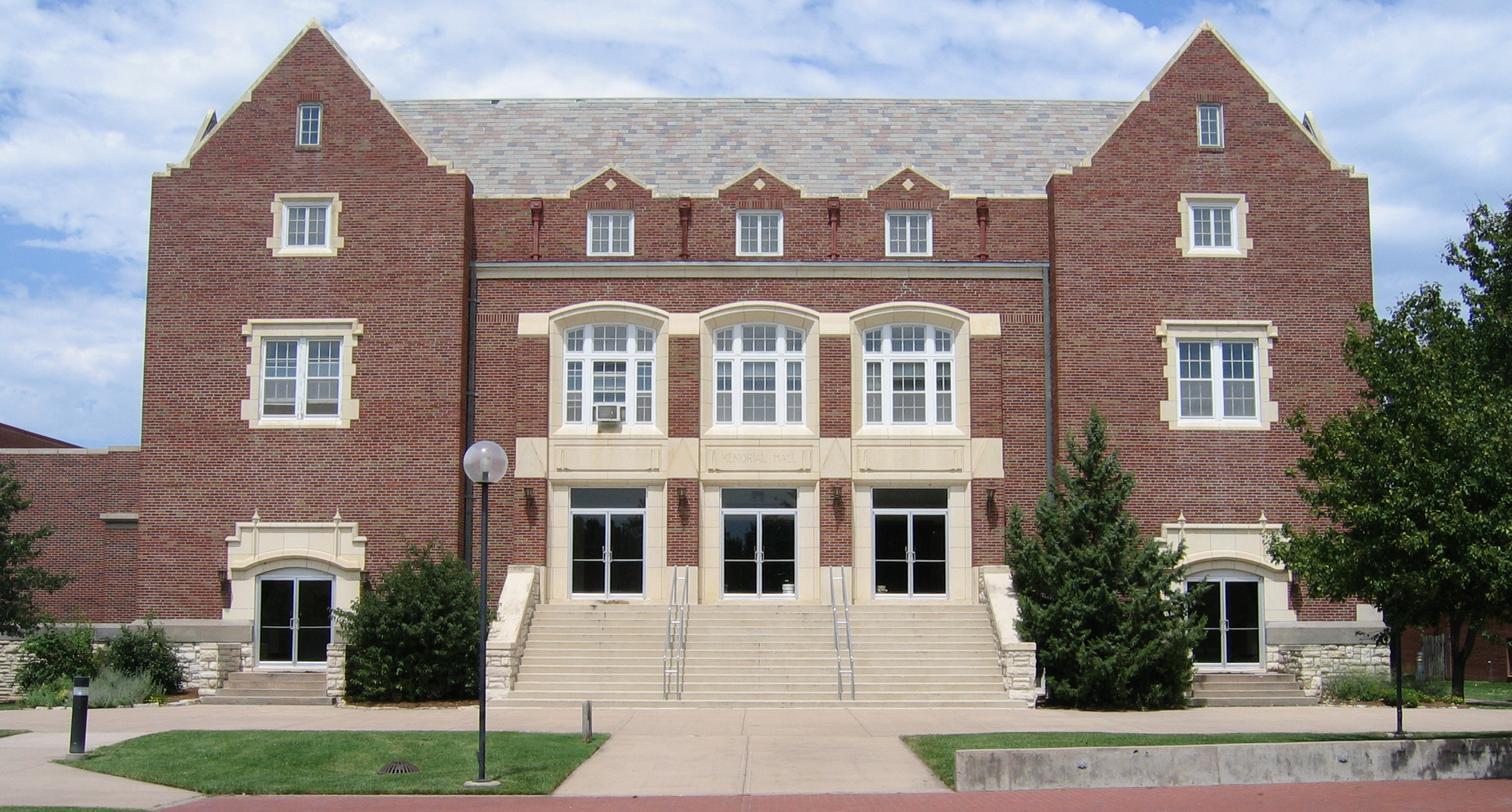
- Memorial Hall on Bethel College campus

- Flag

- Location within Harvey County and Kansas

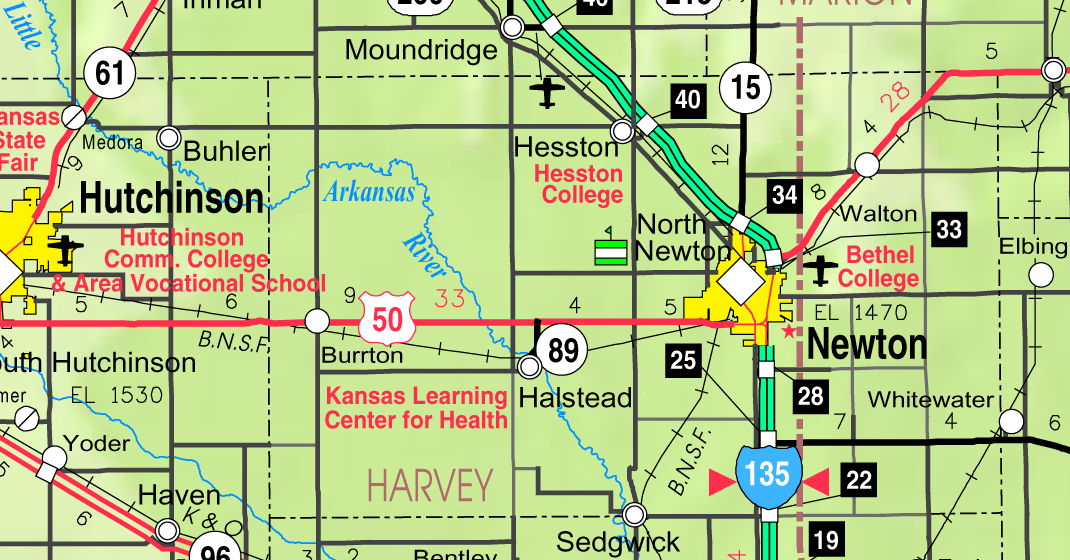
- KDOT map of Harvey County (legend)
- Coordinates: 38°04′36″N 97°20′51″W
- Country: United States
- State: Kansas
- County: Harvey
- Township: Newton
- Incorporated: 1938
- Named for: North of Newton

Government
  - Type: Council-Manager

Area
  - Total: 0.92 sq mi (2.37 km^{2})
  - Land: 0.92 sq mi (2.37 km^{2})
  - Water: 0 sq mi (0.00 km^{2})
- Elevation: 1,437 ft (438 m)

Population (2020)
  - Total: 1,814
  - Density: 1,980/sq mi (765/km^{2})
- Time zone: UTC-6 (CST)
  - Summer (DST): UTC-5 (CDT)
- ZIP Code: 67117
- Area code: 316
- FIPS code: 20-51225
- GNIS ID: 2395258
- Website: northnewton.org

North Newton is a city in Harvey County, Kansas, United States. As of the 2020 census, the population of the city was 1,814. It is located between the north side of the city of Newton (separate entity) and the south side of Interstate I-135. North Newton is home of Bethel College.

== History ==
For millennia, the land now known as Kansas was inhabited by Native Americans. In 1803, most of modern Kansas was secured by the United States as part of the Louisiana Purchase. In 1854, the Kansas Territory was organized, then in 1861 Kansas became the 34th U.S. state. In 1872, Harvey County was founded.

A post office was established as Bethel College on December 19, 1934, then later it was renamed to North Newton on December 1, 1938.

== Geography ==
North Newton is located along the northern side of the city of Newton.

According to the United States Census Bureau, the city has a total area of 0.90 square miles (2.33 km^{2}), all land.

=== Climate ===
The climate in this area is characterized by hot, humid summers and generally mild to cool winters. According to the Köppen Climate Classification system, North Newton has a humid subtropical climate, abbreviated "Cfa" on climate maps.

== Area attractions ==
- Kauffman Museum at Bethel College

== Demographics ==
Historical population
Census	Pop.	Note	%±
1950	566		—
1960	890		57.2%
1970	963		8.2%
1980	1,222		26.9%
1990	1,262		3.3%
2000	1,522		20.6%
2010	1,759		15.6%
2020	1,814		3.1%
U.S. Decennial Census

=== 2020 census ===
As of the 2020 census, North Newton had a population of 1,814, with 700 households and 417 families. The population density was 1,986.9 per square mile (767.1/km^{2}). There were 760 housing units at an average density of 832.4 per square mile (321.4/km^{2}).

The median age was 52.8 years. 11.0% of residents were under the age of 18, 20.5% were from 18 to 24, 12.3% were from 25 to 44, 19.3% were from 45 to 64, and 36.8% were 65 years of age or older. For every 100 females, there were 87.0 males, and for every 100 females age 18 and over, there were 85.3 males age 18 and over. 100.0% of residents lived in urban areas, while 0.0% lived in rural areas.

There were 700 households, of which 13.7% had children under the age of 18 living in them. Of all households, 55.0% were married-couple households, 13.0% were households with a male householder and no spouse or partner present, and 28.6% were households with a female householder and no spouse or partner present. About 36.9% of all households were made up of individuals, and 24.9% had someone living alone who was 65 years of age or older. The average household size was 2.0 and the average family size was 2.6.

There were 760 housing units, of which 7.9% were vacant. The homeowner vacancy rate was 2.4% and the rental vacancy rate was 7.3%.

Racial composition as of the 2020 census
Race	Number	Percent
White	1,571	86.6%
Black or African American	71	3.9%
American Indian and Alaska Native	17	0.9%
Asian	20	1.1%
Native Hawaiian and Other Pacific Islander	1	0.1%
Some other race	52	2.9%
Two or more races	82	4.5%
Hispanic or Latino (of any race)	140	7.7%

The non-Hispanic white-alone population was 84.23%.

=== Demographic estimates ===
The percent of those with a bachelor's degree or higher was estimated to be 39.8% of the population.

=== Income and poverty ===
The 2016–2020 5-year American Community Survey estimates show that the median household income was $71,298 (with a margin of error of +/- $9,759) and the median family income was $95,673 (+/- $14,406). Males had a median income of $34,821 (+/- $17,718) versus $16,731 (+/- $8,049) for females. The median income for those above 16 years old was $26,354 (+/- $14,002). Approximately, 2.0% of families and 5.1% of the population were below the poverty line, including 3.6% of those under the age of 18 and 4.2% of those ages 65 or over.

=== 2010 census ===
As of the census of 2010, there were 1,759 people, 710 households, and 387 families living in the city. The population density was 1,954.4 inhabitants per square mile (754.6/km^{2}). There were 741 housing units at an average density of 823.3 per square mile (317.9/km^{2}). The racial makeup of the city was 94.7% White, 1.4% African American, 0.6% Native American, 0.9% Asian, 1.0% from other races, and 1.5% from two or more races. Hispanic or Latino of any race were 4.2% of the population.

There were 710 households, of which 16.3% had children under the age of 18 living with them, 50.8% were married couples living together, 3.0% had a female householder with no husband present, 0.7% had a male householder with no wife present, and 45.5% were non-families. 43.0% of all households were made up of individuals, and 32% had someone living alone who was 65 years of age or older. The average household size was 1.96 and the average family size was 2.69.

The median age in the city was 48.6 years. 13.6% of residents were under the age of 18; 21.2% were between the ages of 18 and 24; 11.5% were from 25 to 44; 20.6% were from 45 to 64; and 33.2% were 65 years of age or older. The gender makeup of the city was 45.7% male and 54.3% female.

== Government ==
The North Newton government consists of a mayor and five council members. The council meets the 2nd Monday of each month at 7PM.

- City Hall, 2601 N Main.

== Education ==
=== Primary and secondary education ===
The community is served by Newton USD 373 public school district.

=== College ===
North Newton is home to Bethel College, the oldest Mennonite college in the United States since its founding in 1887.

== Infrastructure ==
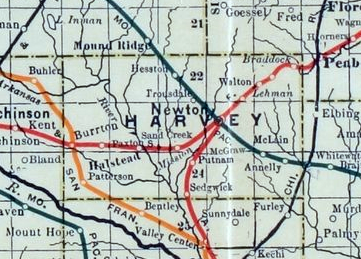
1915 railroad map of Harvey County

=== Transportation ===
Interstate I-135 runs along the north side of North Newton.

=== Utilities ===
- Internet
  - Cable is provided by Cox Communications.
  - Wireless is provided by Pixius Communications. Ideatek
  - Satellite is provided by HughesNet, StarBand, WildBlue.
- TV
  - Cable is provided by Cox Communications.
  - Satellite is provided by DirecTV, Dish Network.
  - Terrestrial is provided by regional digital TV stations.
- Telephone
  - Landline is provided by AT&T.
  - Cellular is provided by AT&T Mobility.
- Electricity
  - City is provided by Westar Energy.
- Gas
  - Service is provided by Kansas Gas Service.
- Water
  - City is provided by City of Newton, billed by City of North Newton.
  - Rural is provided by Harvey County RWD #1 (map).
- Sewer
  - Service is billed by City of North Newton.
- Trash
  - Service is billed by City of North Newton.

== Notable people ==
- Kate E. Brubacher, United States Attorney for the District of Kansas
- Rachel deBenedet, actress and singer.

== See also ==
- List of people from Harvey County, Kansas
- National Register of Historic Places listings in Harvey County, Kansas
- Bethel Threshers
- Threshing Stone
- Chisholm Trail
