= Bethel College (Kansas) =

Christian college in North Newton, Kansas, US

- Type: Private college
- Established: 1887; 139 years ago
- Religious affiliation: Mennonite Church USA
- Endowment: $30 Million
- President: Wynn Goering
- Academic staff: 60
- Students: 500
- Location: North Newton, Kansas, United States; 38°04′29″N 97°20′33″W
- Campus: Rural, 90 acres (36 ha)
- Colors: Maroon and gray
- Nickname: Threshers
- Sporting affiliations: NAIA – KCAC
- Mascot: Thresher
- Website: www.bethelks.edu

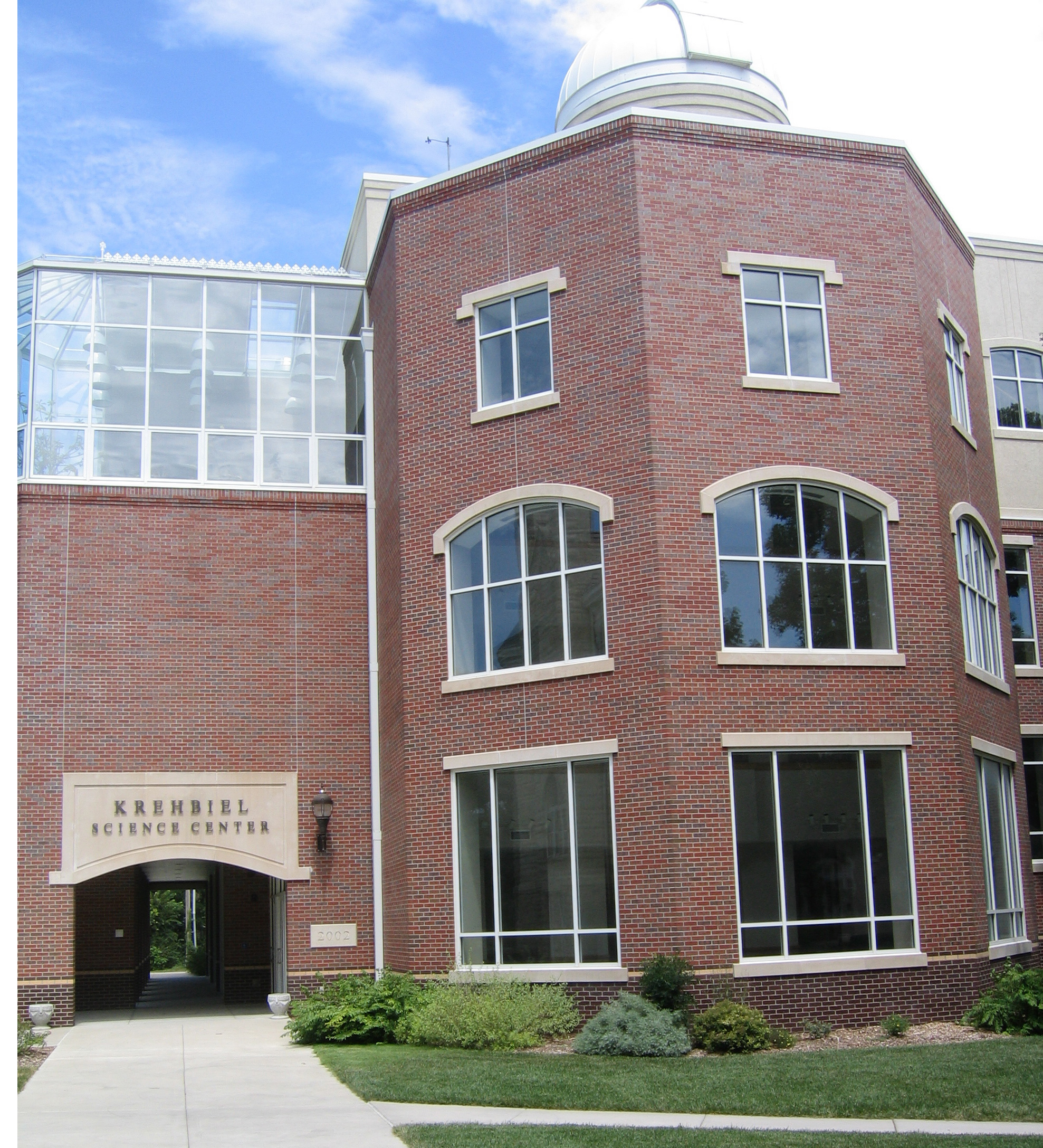
Krehbiel Science Center, 2007

Bethel College is a private Christian college in North Newton, Kansas, United States. It is affiliated with Mennonite Church USA.

== History ==
Bethel College, founded in 1887, is the oldest Mennonite college in North America. Bethel College became the second institution of higher learning associated with the General Conference Mennonite Church (now Mennonite Church USA), replacing Wadsworth Institute in Ohio, which had closed in 1878.

During the 1880s, Kansas cities and towns competed with one another to create and construct institutions and buildings, including colleges. On May 11, 1887, representatives of Newton and the Kansas Conference of Mennonites signed a charter for Bethel College to be built on a plot of about 120 acres (0.49 km^{2}) north of the town of Newton. Around 2,500 people gathered on the property on October 12, 1888, to lay the cornerstone of the main building, which serves as the current Administration Building and has been on the National Register of Historic Places since 1972.

The building project took around five years to complete. Fundraising was slow, but on September 20, 1893, a service of dedication opened the building, and classes began.

Cornelius H. Wedel, a young teacher from Halstead, Kan., was the college's first president. There were 98 students – 77 men and 21 women ages 13 to mid-30s – living on the west end of the main floor and the ground floor of the Ad Building, while Wedel and his family lived on the east end of the main floor. The classrooms, chapel and library of 600 volumes were located on the second floor.

In those days, students were up by 5 a.m. and in bed by 10 p.m. Each worked two hours a day at a campus job. Student conduct was strictly monitored. Men and women were not allowed to be in the library on the same evening, so they alternated evenings.

Five men, including President Wedel, made up the first faculty. They taught classes in Bible, church history, German, English, mathematics, science and music. Bethel was a bilingual college until early 1918, when the United States entered World War I. German was removed from the curriculum, but later reinstated and remained as a major until 2006, when it switched to a minor.

== Campus facilities ==
- Bethel College Administration Building
- U.S. National Register of Historic Places
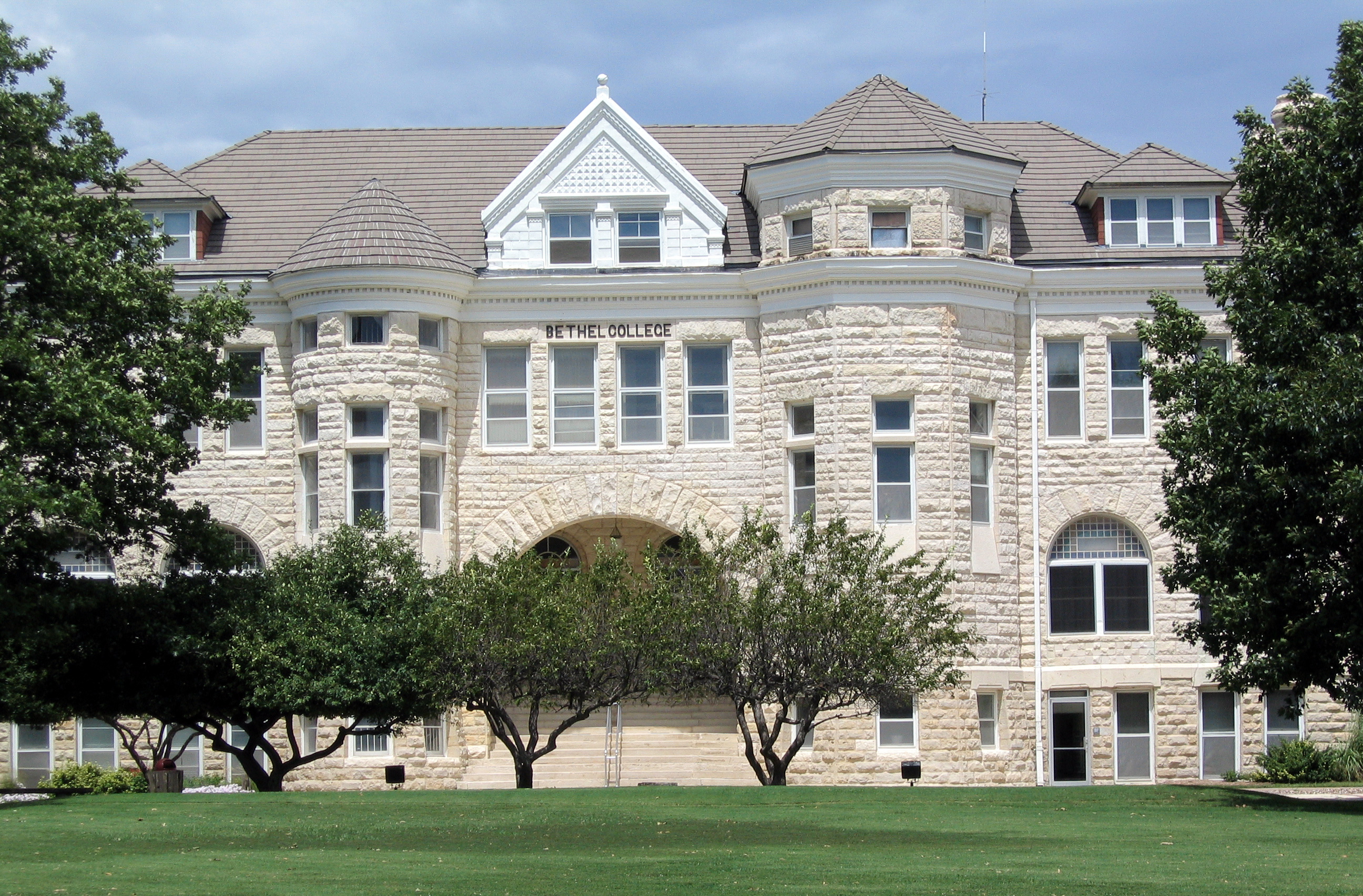
- Bethel College Administration Building
- Location: Bethel College campus, North Newton, Kansas
- Area: 1.5 acres (0.61 ha)
- Built: 1887
- Architects: Proudfoot, Willis T.
- Architectural style: Romanesque
- NRHP reference No.: 72000505
- Added to NRHP: March 16, 1972

The Ad Building was the main campus structure until 1925, when Science Hall was completed. The cornerstone for Memorial Hall was laid in 1938 to commemorate the 50th anniversary of the laying of the Ad Building cornerstone. "Mem Hall" was completed in 1942. Various other buildings have come and gone since the Ad Building went up, but of those still remaining, the next to be built after Mem Hall was the current Franz Art Center, in 1947 – originally the general shop, home of the industrial arts department and the shop for the Bethel College farm, and now the home of the Department of Visual Arts and Design. The library finally moved into its own building in 1952 – today this is the Mennonite Library and Archives. Bethel College Mennonite Church, founded in 1897, met in the Ad Building chapel for almost 60 years, until its current building south of the main campus was completed in 1956.

The 1960s and 1970s saw a building boom on the Bethel campus, beginning in 1958 with construction of Haury Hall as a student residence, with a major addition in 1963. Warkentin Court (student residence) and the Fine Arts Center were both completed in 1966, Thresher Gym in 1978 and Schultz Student Center and cafeteria in 1979. In 1986, Mantz Library was built on to the old library, and Kauffman Museum got its current building. The newest buildings on campus are Voth Hall (student residence; 2000) and Krehbiel Science Center (2002); the newest structure is Thresher Stadium in the Thresher Sports Complex (2005). The old Science Hall underwent a multi-million-dollar renovation – completed in 2012, including a major addition on the east side – into the James A. Will Family Academic Center.

Luyken Fine Arts Center includes Krehbiel Auditorium, and the Prairie Sky Stage outdoors, for stage performances, lectures and events, and the Robert W. Regier Art Gallery, which hosts exhibits by local, regional, national and international artists, including Bethel alumni, in all types of media. It houses the music, drama and communication arts departments.

== Organization and administration ==
Jon C. Gering, Ph.D., was inaugurated as Bethel's 15th president on October 7, 2018, and appointed to a second term in July 2021.

== Academics ==
Bethel's curriculum is founded on a general education program in the liberal arts and sciences, and is geared toward students of moderate to high academic ability. There are requirements for the study of religion, and a cross-cultural experience. The college offers majors in the traditional liberal arts disciplines and selected career areas – with the newest majors being software development, and biochemistry and molecular biology – and accredited professional programs in nursing, social work and teacher education.

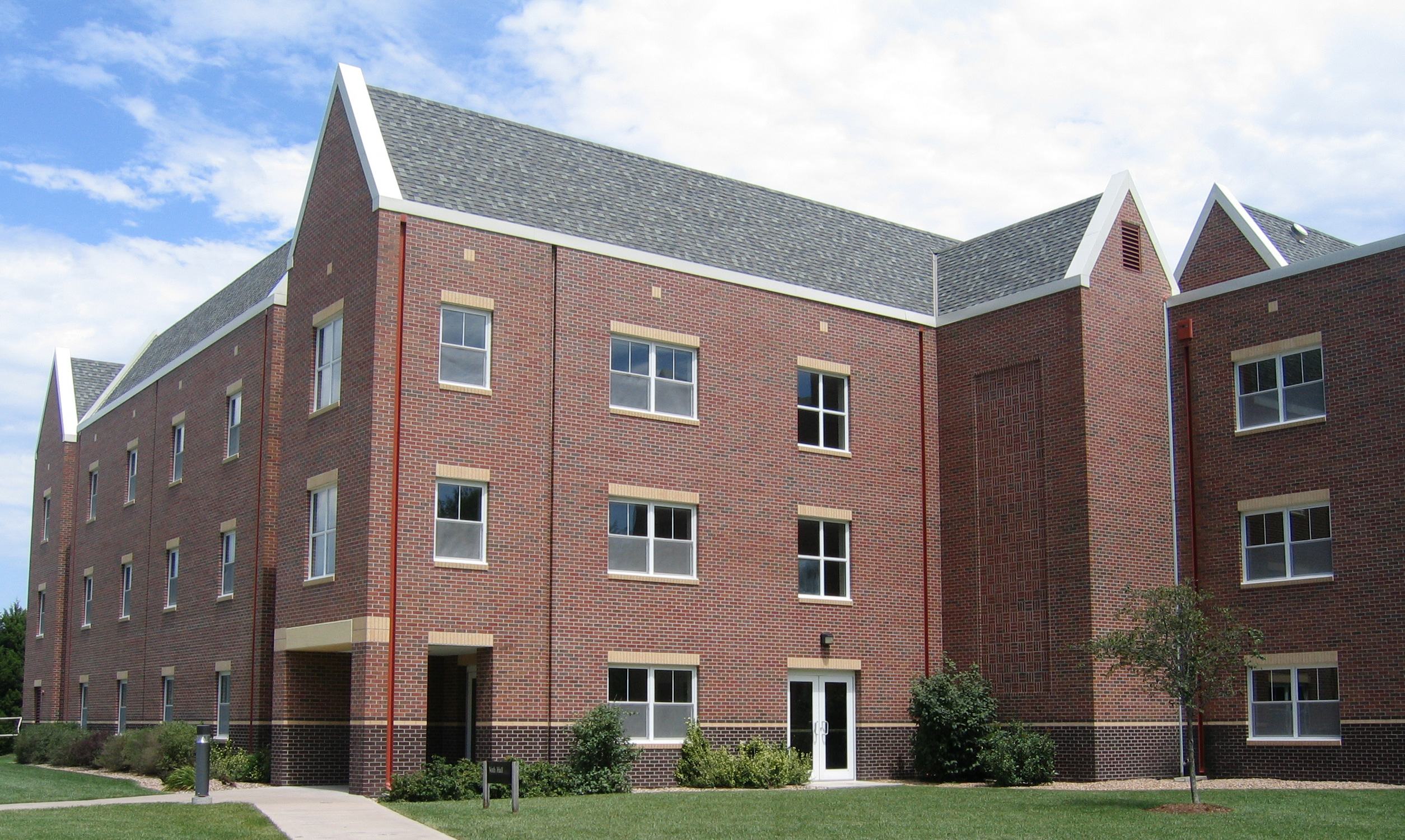
Voth Hall, student housing, 2007

== Athletics ==
The Bethel athletic teams are called the Threshers. The college is a member of the National Association of Intercollegiate Athletics (NAIA), primarily competing in the Kansas Collegiate Athletic Conference (KCAC) since the 1939–40 academic year; which they were a member on a previous stint from 1902–03 to December 1928 (of the 1928–29 school year).

Bethel competes in 17 intercollegiate varsity sports: Men's sports include basketball, cross country, football, golf, soccer, tennis and track and field; while women's sports include basketball, cross country, flag football (added in fall 2022), soccer, softball, tennis, track and field and volleyball; and co-ed sports include cheerleading and dance.

=== Mascot ===
The mascot is a threshing stone, based on a piece of farm equipment that the Mennonites who moved to the Great Plains of the United States and Canada in the late 1800s used briefly (just before the invention and near-universal adoption of the mechanical threshing machine) for threshing their wheat crops.

In 2022, a new mascot, "Threshy," was revealed during the college's Fall Festival homecoming game. The mascot incorporated Bethel's threshing stone logos and styles on the character's head, arms, and shoulder, and was covered in the college's iconic maroon and gray.

=== Facilities ===
The newest facilities on campus are both athletics-related, the Ward Tennis Center (2010) and the Allen Wedel Softball Field (2017; clubhouse completed summer 2021).

== Notable people ==
Faculty

- Jacob Ewert, Mennonite socialist, pacifist and publisher
- Joseph Kesselring, voice instructor, writer and playwright

Alumni

- Daniel Hege (B.A., 1987), music director, Wichita Symphony Orchestra
- John Janzen (B.A., 1961), professor emeritus, Department of Anthropology, University of Kansas
- Gordon D. Kaufman (B.A., 1947), theologian and professor, Harvard Divinity School
- Susan Loepp (B.A., 1989), mathematician
- Polingaysi Qöyawayma (Bethel Academy, 1915), Hopi educator, writer and potter; Outstanding Alumnus, 1979
- Travis Schlenk, NBA front office executive
- Jacob A. Schowalter, philanthropist
- Waldo R. Wedel (Bethel Academy, 1926), archaeologist, central figure in the study of the prehistory of the Great Plains
- Dallas Wiebe, writer

== See also ==
- Threshing stone
- Newton, Kansas
- Arkansas Valley Interurban Railway
