= Bethel Threshers =

- University: Bethel College
- Nickname: Threshers
- NAIA: Region IV
- Conference: Kansas
- Athletic director: Tim Swartzendruber
- Location: North Newton, Kansas
- Varsity teams: 17
- Football stadium: Thresher Stadium
- Basketball arena: Thresher Gym
- Softball stadium: Wedel Field
- Soccer stadium: Thresher Stadium
- Tennis venue: Ward Center
- Colors: Maroon and gray
- Website: bethelthreshers.com
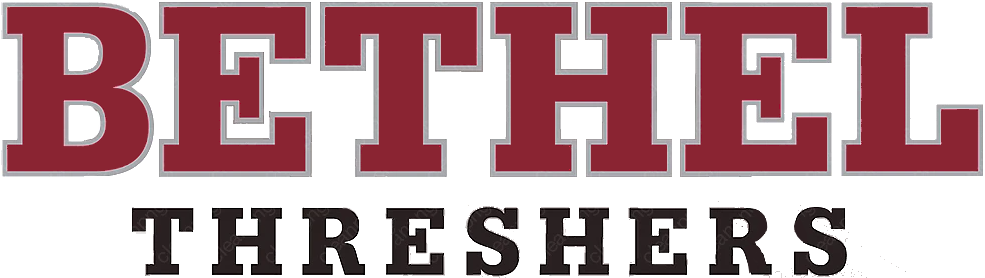

The Bethel Threshers are the athletic teams that represent Bethel College, located in North Newton, Kansas, in intercollegiate sports as a member of the National Association of Intercollegiate Athletics (NAIA), primarily competing in the Kansas Collegiate Athletic Conference (KCAC) since the 1939–40 academic year and in which they were a member on a previous stint from 1902–03 to December 1928 (of the 1928–29 school year).

== Nickname ==
Bethel's athletic teams were known at the "Graymaroons" from the 1920s until 1960, when the Threshers fight name was adopted.

== Varsity sports ==
Bethel competes in 15 intercollegiate varsity sports:

| Men's sports | Women's sports |
|---|---|
| Basketball | Basketball |
| Cross country | Cross country |
| Football | Flag football |
| Golf | Golf |
| Soccer | Soccer |
| Tennis | Softball |
| Track and field^{1} | Tennis |
| | Track and field^{1} |

=== Basketball ===
Bethel's basketball program is led by head coach Jayson Artaz. Since taking over in 2018 and as of completion of the 2024 season, Artaz's teams have compiled a record of 157 wins and 72 losses. One of Bethel's most notable players is Jaylon Scott

=== Football ===
Bethel College began its football program in 1914 under head coach William E. Schroeder. As of completion of the 2022 season, the teams have produced a cumulative record of 328 wins, 529 losses, and 13 ties.

From 2018 through 2021, Terry Harrison led the Threshers to back-to-back conference titles in 2020 and 2021 before resigning to accept the head coaching position at Friends University. Harrison replaced Morris Lolar and finished his tenure at Bethel with 37 wins and 14 losses.

The next head coach was A.B. Stokes. Stokes led the Threshers to their third consecutive conference title in 2022. He resigned prior to the 2024 season.

The Bethel football program is now led by Josh Lawson.

=== Track & field ===
Bethel's track and field team has found success on the national level. In 2008, Jeff Buller won his second consecutive national championship in the javelin with a throw of 214 feet 8 inches.

== Facilities ==
| Venue | Sport(s) | Ref. |
|---|---|---|
| Thresher Stadium | Football; Soccer | |
| Thresher Gym | Basketball | |
| Wedel Field | Softball | |
| Ward Center | Tennis | |
