= List of Kansas Collegiate Athletic Conference football standings (1890–1955) =

This is a list of yearly Kansas Collegiate Athletic Conference football standings.

== Kansas Collegiate Athletic Conference standings ==
1913 Kansas Collegiate Athletic Conference football standings
	Conf.					Overall
Team	W		L		T	W		L		T
College of Emporia +	5	–	0	–	1	5	–	2	–	1
Southwestern (KS) +	4	–	1	–	1	6	–	1	–	1
Washburn	2	–	0	–	2	3	–	2	–	2
Kansas State	2	–	1	–	1	3	–	4	–	1
Baker	3	–	2	–	0	4	–	4	–	0
Friends	3	–	2	–	0	?	–	?	–	?
Kansas State Normal	4	–	4	–	0	4	–	6	–	0
Cooper	3	–	3	–	0	?	–	?	–	?
Pittsburg Normal	1	–	1	–	1	4	–	2	–	1
St. Mary's (KS)	2	–	3	–	0	3	–	4	–	1
Fairmount	1	–	6	–	0	2	–	6	–	1
Hays Normal	0	–	1	–	0	4	–	2	–	0
Kansas City University	0	–	2	–	0	0	–	3	–	0
Ottawa	0	–	4	–	0	1	–	4	–	0
+ – Conference co-champions

1915 Kansas Collegiate Athletic Conference football standings
	Conf.					Overall
Team	W		L		T	W		L		T
Baker +	4	–	0	–	0	5	–	3	–	0
Kansas State Normal +	4	–	0	–	1	5	–	2	–	2
Cooper	6	–	1	–	1	7	–	1	–	1
Friends	4	–	1	–	0	5	–	3	–	0
Kansas Wesleyan	5	–	3	–	0	5	–	4	–	0
Hays Normal	3	–	3	–	0	4	–	3	–	0
Southwestern (KS)	3	–	3	–	1	5	–	4	–	1
Pittsburg Normal	2	–	2	–	0	4	–	5	–	0
College of Emporia	3	–	5	–	0	3	–	5	–	0
Ottawa	2	–	4	–	1	4	–	4	–	1
Washburn	1	–	2	–	1	2	–	5	–	1
Fairmount	2	–	5	–	1	3	–	5	–	1
St. Mary's (KS)	1	–	4	–	0	3	–	5	–	0
Bethany (KS)	1	–	6	–	0	1	–	6	–	0
Kansas City University	0	–	2	–	0	0	–	4	–	0
+ – Conference co-champions

1916 Kansas Collegiate Athletic Conference football standings
	Conf.					Overall
Team	W		L		T	W		L		T
Kansas State Normal $	5	–	1	–	1	6	–	3	–	1
Hays Normal	4	–	1	–	0	5	–	2	–	0
Southwestern (KS)	6	–	2	–	0	6	–	3	–	0
Pittsburg Normal	3	–	1	–	0	7	–	3	–	0
Fairmount	7	–	3	–	0	7	–	3	–	0
Cooper	6	–	3	–	0	6	–	3	–	0
Baker	4	–	2	–	1	4	–	4	–	1
Friends	3	–	2	–	2	3	–	4	–	2
Washburn	3	–	4	–	0	3	–	6	–	0
St. Mary's (KS)	2	–	3	–	1	4	–	3	–	1
College of Emporia	3	–	5	–	0	3	–	5	–	0
Ottawa	2	–	5	–	2	2	–	5	–	2
Bethany (KS)	2	–	5	–	1	2	–	6	–	1
Midland	0	–	3	–	0	3	–	5	–	0
Bethel (KS)	0	–	3	–	0	0	–	3	–	0
Kansas Wesleyan	0	–	7	–	0	0	–	8	–	0
$ – Conference champion

1917 Kansas Collegiate Athletic Conference football standings
	Conf.					Overall
Team	W		L		T	W		L		T
Hays Normal $	6	–	0	–	0	7	–	0	–	0
Kansas State Normal	5	–	0	–	1	5	–	3	–	1
College of Emporia	6	–	2	–	0	6	–	2	–	0
Southwestern (KS)	6	–	3	–	0	6	–	4	–	0
St. Mary's (KS)	4	–	2	–	0	6	–	3	–	0
Pittsburg Normal	3	–	2	–	1	4	–	3	–	2
Fairmount	3	–	3	–	2	3	–	3	–	2
Friends	3	–	3	–	1	3	–	5	–	1
Baker	3	–	4	–	1	3	–	5	–	1
Ottawa	2	–	4	–	1	2	–	5	–	1
Washburn	2	–	5	–	2	2	–	6	–	2
Cooper	2	–	5	–	1	2	–	5	–	1
Bethany (KS)	3	–	6	–	0	3	–	7	–	0
Midland	0	–	4	–	0	4	–	5	–	0
Kansas Wesleyan	0	–	6	–	0	1	–	8	–	0
$ – Conference champion

1919 Kansas Collegiate Athletic Conference football standings
	Conf.					Overall
Team	W		L		T	W		L		T
College of Emporia $	8	–	0	–	0	8	–	0	–	0
Pittsburg Normal	5	–	0	–	1	7	–	2	–	1
Washburn	7	–	1	–	0	7	–	1	–	1
Southwestern (KS)	6	–	3	–	0	6	–	4	–	0
St. Mary's (KS)	3	–	2	–	0	6	–	2	–	0
Baker	3	–	2	–	1	4	–	4	–	1
Friends	3	–	4	–	0	4	–	5	–	0
Hays Normal	3	–	4	–	0	3	–	6	–	0
Bethany (KS)	2	–	5	–	1	2	–	5	–	1
Kansas Wesleyan	2	–	4	–	0	3	–	5	–	0
Ottawa	2	–	4	–	2	2	–	4	–	2
Fairmount	2	–	6	–	2	2	–	6	–	2
Kansas State Normal	1	–	4	–	2	1	–	6	–	2
Cooper	0	–	8	–	1	0	–	8	–	1
$ – Conference champion

1920 Kansas Collegiate Athletic Conference football standings
	Conf.					Overall
Team	W		L		T	W		L		T
Washburn +	4	–	0	–	2	4	–	2	–	3
Friends +	7	–	1	–	0	7	–	1	–	0
College of Emporia	6	–	1	–	1	6	–	1	–	1
St. Mary's (KS)	4	–	2	–	0	6	–	2	–	0
Baker	4	–	3	–	0	5	–	4	–	0
Bethany (KS)	4	–	3	–	1	4	–	3	–	1
Fairmount	4	–	3	–	2	4	–	3	–	2
Pittsburg Normal	3	–	3	–	0	5	–	4	–	1
Kansas State Normal	2	–	3	–	1	2	–	4	–	2
Hays Normal	2	–	3	–	1	2	–	5	–	1
Southwestern (KS)	2	–	5	–	1	2	–	5	–	2
Ottawa	1	–	6	–	0	1	–	6	–	0
Kansas Wesleyan	0	–	3	–	2	0	–	5	–	3
Sterling	0	–	7	–	1	0	–	7	–	1
+ – Conference co-champions

1921 Kansas Collegiate Athletic Conference football standings
	Conf.					Overall
Team	W		L		T	W		L		T
Hays Normal $	6	–	0	–	0	6	–	1	–	0
Kansas State Normal	6	–	1	–	0	6	–	1	–	0
Pittsburg Normal	5	–	1	–	1	7	–	2	–	1
College of Emporia	4	–	1	–	0	4	–	2	–	1
Fairmount	4	–	2	–	1	5	–	2	–	1
Bethany (KS)	4	–	3	–	0	5	–	3	–	0
Baker	4	–	3	–	1	5	–	3	–	1
Southwestern (KS)	4	–	4	–	0	5	–	4	–	0
Friends	3	–	3	–	1	3	–	4	–	1
Washburn	3	–	3	–	1	3	–	5	–	1
St. Mary's (KS)	2	–	5	–	0	3	–	5	–	0
Ottawa	2	–	5	–	1	3	–	5	–	1
McPherson	2	–	6	–	0	5	–	6	–	0
Sterling	1	–	6	–	0	1	–	6	–	0
Kansas Wesleyan	0	–	7	–	0	0	–	8	–	0
$ – Conference champion

1922 Kansas Collegiate Athletic Conference football standings
	Conf.					Overall
Team	W		L		T	W		L		T
Baker $	7	–	1	–	0	8	–	1	–	0
Kansas State Normal	6	–	1	–	0	6	–	2	–	0
College of Emporia	5	–	1	–	2	6	–	1	–	2
Friends	5	–	2	–	0	5	–	2	–	0
Southwestern (KS)	5	–	2	–	2	5	–	3	–	2
Bethany (KS)	5	–	3	–	0	5	–	3	–	0
McPherson	5	–	4	–	0	5	–	4	–	0
Sterling	4	–	4	–	0	4	–	4	–	0
St. Mary's (KS)	3	–	3	–	0	4	–	4	–	0
Pittsburg Teachers	3	–	4	–	0	4	–	5	–	0
Fairmount	3	–	5	–	1	3	–	6	–	1
Hays Teachers	2	–	4	–	1	2	–	4	–	1
Kansas Wesleyan	2	–	7	–	0	2	–	7	–	0
Washburn	1	–	5	–	0	1	–	7	–	0
Bethel (KS)	0	–	3	–	0	0	–	3	–	0
Ottawa	0	–	7	–	0	0	–	8	–	0
$ – Conference champion

1923 Kansas Collegiate Athletic Conference football standings
	Conf.					Overall
Team	W		L		T	W		L		T
Sterling $	7	–	1	–	1	7	–	1	–	1
Friends	5	–	1	–	0	5	–	2	–	0
Emporia Teachers	5	–	1	–	1	5	–	1	–	1
McPherson	6	–	2	–	1	6	–	2	–	1
Baker	3	–	1	–	4	4	–	1	–	4
Ottawa	4	–	2	–	2	5	–	2	–	2
College of Emporia	5	–	3	–	0	5	–	3	–	0
Hays Teachers	3	–	3	–	2	4	–	3	–	2
Pittsburg Teachers	2	–	2	–	2	3	–	3	–	2
Fairmount	2	–	2	–	2	2	–	4	–	2
St. Mary's (KS)	3	–	4	–	0	4	–	4	–	0
Kansas Wesleyan	2	–	5	–	1	4	–	5	–	1
Bethany (KS)	2	–	7	–	0	2	–	7	–	0
Southwestern (KS)	1	–	5	–	2	2	–	5	–	2
Bethel (KS)	0	–	5	–	0	0	–	5	–	0
Washburn	0	–	6	–	2	0	–	8	–	2
$ – Conference champion

1924 Kansas Collegiate Athletic Conference football standings
	Conf.					Overall
Team	W		L		T	W		L		T
Pittsburg Teachers $	5	–	0	–	1	7	–	0	–	1
College of Emporia	6	–	1	–	0	6	–	1	–	0
Sterling	6	–	2	–	1	6	–	2	–	1
Fairmount	5	–	2	–	1	6	–	2	–	1
Kansas Wesleyan	5	–	3	–	0	5	–	3	–	0
Bethany (KS)	4	–	3	–	2	4	–	3	–	2
Emporia Teachers	3	–	3	–	2	3	–	4	–	2
Southwestern (KS)	2	–	2	–	2	4	–	2	–	2
Friends	3	–	4	–	1	3	–	4	–	1
Hays Teachers	3	–	4	–	0	3	–	4	–	0
McPherson	3	–	5	–	1	3	–	5	–	1
Baker	3	–	5	–	0	4	–	5	–	0
St. Mary's (KS)	2	–	4	–	0	3	–	4	–	0
Ottawa	2	–	6	–	1	2	–	6	–	1
Bethel (KS)	1	–	4	–	0	1	–	4	–	0
Washburn	1	–	6	–	0	2	–	7	–	0
$ – Conference champion

1925 Kansas Collegiate Athletic Conference football standings
	Conf.					Overall
Team	W		L		T	W		L		T
College of Emporia +	7	–	0	–	0	7	–	0	–	0
Bethany (KS) +	7	–	0	–	0	7	–	0	–	0
Fairmount	3	–	0	–	4	3	–	1	–	4
Pittsburg Teachers	5	–	2	–	0	5	–	2	–	1
Emporia Teachers	3	–	2	–	1	4	–	3	–	1
Kansas Wesleyan	3	–	2	–	1	4	–	2	–	1
Southwestern (KS)	4	–	3	–	0	5	–	3	–	0
Baker	3	–	3	–	1	4	–	3	–	1
St. Mary's (KS)	3	–	3	–	1	4	–	3	–	1
Washburn	2	–	4	–	1	2	–	4	–	1
Bethel (KS)	1	–	4	–	0	2	–	4	–	0
Hays Teachers	1	–	4	–	1	2	–	4	–	1
Ottawa	1	–	4	–	2	1	–	5	–	2
Friends	1	–	5	–	1	2	–	5	–	1
Sterling	1	–	5	–	1	1	–	5	–	1
McPherson	0	–	4	–	2	1	–	4	–	2
+ – Conference co-champions

1926 Kansas Collegiate Athletic Conference football standings
	Conf.					Overall
Team	W		L		T	W		L		T
Emporia Teachers $	7	–	0	–	0	7	–	0	–	0
College of Emporia	6	–	1	–	0	7	–	1	–	0
Bethany (KS)	6	–	1	–	0	6	–	2	–	0
Wichita	5	–	1	–	0	6	–	2	–	0
Ottawa	5	–	2	–	0	5	–	2	–	1
Friends	4	–	2	–	0	2	–	6	–	0
Sterling	4	–	3	–	0	4	–	4	–	0
Washburn	3	–	3	–	1	3	–	4	–	1
Kansas Wesleyan	3	–	4	–	0	4	–	4	–	0
Baker	2	–	3	–	2	3	–	3	–	2
McPherson	2	–	4	–	0	3	–	4	–	1
Hays Teachers	2	–	5	–	0	3	–	5	–	0
Pittsburg Teachers	2	–	5	–	0	2	–	6	–	0
St. Mary's (KS)	2	–	5	–	0	2	–	5	–	0
St. Benedict's	0	–	2	–	1	1	–	6	–	1
Southwestern (KS)	0	–	6	–	0	2	–	6	–	0
Bethel (KS)	0	–	6	–	0	0	–	7	–	0
$ – Conference champion

1927 Kansas Collegiate Athletic Conference football standings
	Conf.					Overall
Team	W		L		T	W		L		T
Baker +	6	–	0	–	1	7	–	0	–	1
College of Emporia +	6	–	0	–	1	7	–	0	–	1
Emporia Teachers +	6	–	0	–	1	7	–	0	–	1
Kansas Wesleyan +	6	–	0	–	1	7	–	0	–	1
Pittsburg Teachers	5	–	2	–	0	6	–	2	–	0
Southwestern (KS)	5	–	2	–	0	6	–	2	–	0
Bethany (KS)	3	–	2	–	1	4	–	2	–	1
St. Mary's (KS)	4	–	3	–	0	4	–	3	–	0
Sterling	4	–	4	–	0	4	–	4	–	0
Wichita	2	–	4	–	0	3	–	4	–	0
Hays Teachers	2	–	4	–	1	3	–	5	–	1
Ottawa	1	–	5	–	1	1	–	6	–	1
Friends	1	–	6	–	0	2	–	6	–	0
McPherson	1	–	6	–	0	1	–	7	–	0
Washburn	1	–	6	–	0	1	–	7	–	0
St. Benedict's	0	–	3	–	1	2	–	5	–	1
Bethel (KS)	0	–	6	–	0	2	–	6	–	0
+ – Conference co-champions

1928 Kansas Collegiate Athletic Conference football standings
	Conf.					Overall
Team	W		L		T	W		L		T
Baker $	5	–	0	–	2	6	–	0	–	2
Bethany (KS)	5	–	1	–	0	5	–	3	–	0
Kansas Wesleyan	5	–	1	–	1	6	–	2	–	1
St. Benedict's	4	–	1	–	1	4	–	3	–	1
Sterling	3	–	2	–	1	4	–	3	–	1
St. Mary's (KS)	2	–	2	–	3	2	–	3	–	3
Friends	3	–	4	–	0	3	–	6	–	0
McPherson	1	–	5	–	1	1	–	6	–	1
Ottawa	0	–	6	–	1	0	–	7	–	1
Bethel (KS)	0	–	6	–	0	0	–	7	–	0
$ – Conference champion

1929 Kansas Collegiate Athletic Conference football standings
	Conf.					Overall
Team	W		L		T	W		L		T
Kansas Wesleyan $	4	–	0	–	1	6	–	0	–	2
Bethany (KS)	4	–	1	–	0	5	–	3	–	1
Baker	2	–	2	–	1	5	–	3	–	1
McPherson	2	–	3	–	0	4	–	4	–	0
St. Mary's (KS)	1	–	2	–	2	2	–	5	–	2
Ottawa	0	–	5	–	0	2	–	6	–	0

1930 Kansas Collegiate Athletic Conference football standings
	Conf.					Overall
Team	W		L		T	W		L		T
St. Mary's (KS) $	5	–	0	–	0	6	–	3	–	0
Baker	4	–	1	–	0	5	–	4	–	0
Kansas Wesleyan	2	–	2	–	1	4	–	3	–	2
Bethany (KS)	2	–	2	–	1	3	–	4	–	2
Ottawa	0	–	4	–	0	1	–	6	–	0
McPherson	0	–	4	–	0	1	–	7	–	0
$ – Conference champion

1931 Kansas Collegiate Athletic Conference football standings
	Conf.					Overall
Team	W		L		T	W		L		T
Kansas Wesleyan $	2	–	0	–	2	6	–	0	–	2
Ottawa	2	–	2	–	0	5	–	3	–	0
Bethany (KS)	1	–	1	–	2	2	–	4	–	3
Baker	1	–	2	–	1	2	–	5	–	2
McPherson	1	–	2	–	1	2	–	6	–	1
$ – Conference champion

1932 Kansas Collegiate Athletic Conference football standings
	Conf.					Overall
Team	W		L		T	W		L		T
Ottawa $	4	–	0	–	0	7	–	1	–	0
Kansas Wesleyan	3	–	1	–	0	5	–	3	–	0
Baker	2	–	2	–	0	4	–	4	–	1
Bethany (KS)	1	–	3	–	0	1	–	6	–	0
McPherson	0	–	4	–	0	3	–	6	–	0
$ – Conference champion

1933 Kansas Collegiate Athletic Conference football standings
	Conf.					Overall
Team	W		L		T	W		L		T
Ottawa $	4	–	0	–	0	5	–	3	–	0
McPherson	3	–	1	–	0	7	–	2	–	0
Kansas Wesleyan	2	–	2	–	0	5	–	4	–	0
Baker	1	–	3	–	0	2	–	7	–	0
Bethany (KS)	0	–	4	–	0	1	–	7	–	0
$ – Conference champion

1934 Kansas Collegiate Athletic Conference football standings
	Conf.					Overall
Team	W		L		T	W		L		T
Kansas Wesleyan +	4	–	1	–	0	5	–	4	–	0
Baker +	4	–	1	–	0	4	–	4	–	1
McPherson	3	–	1	–	1	6	–	2	–	1
College of Emporia	2	–	2	–	1	2	–	5	–	1
Ottawa	1	–	4	–	0	1	–	6	–	1
Bethany (KS)	0	–	5	–	0	1	–	8	–	0
+ – Conference co-champions

1935 Kansas Collegiate Athletic Conference football standings
	Conf.					Overall
Team	W		L		T	W		L		T
Kansas Wesleyan $	4	–	0	–	1	4	–	3	–	1
Baker	3	–	1	–	1	3	–	4	–	2
McPherson	2	–	1	–	2	4	–	3	–	2
College of Emporia	3	–	2	–	0	3	–	5	–	1
Bethany (KS)	1	–	4	–	0	4	–	4	–	0
Ottawa	0	–	5	–	0	0	–	8	–	0
$ – Conference champion

1936 Kansas Collegiate Athletic Conference football standings
	Conf.					Overall
Team	W		L		T	W		L		T
Kansas Wesleyan $	4	–	0	–	1	7	–	1	–	1
McPherson	3	–	1	–	1	5	–	3	–	1
Bethany (KS)	3	–	1	–	1	4	–	2	–	2
Ottawa	1	–	2	–	2	3	–	4	–	2
Baker	1	–	4	–	0	2	–	6	–	0
College of Emporia	0	–	4	–	1	5	–	4	–	1
$ – Conference champion

1937 Kansas Collegiate Athletic Conference football standings
	Conf.					Overall
Team	W		L		T	W		L		T
Baker $	4	–	1	–	0	5	–	4	–	0
Kansas Wesleyan	3	–	2	–	0	5	–	3	–	1
Bethany (KS)	3	–	2	–	0	4	–	5	–	0
Ottawa	2	–	2	–	0	5	–	2	–	0
College of Emporia	1	–	3	–	0	2	–	6	–	0
McPherson	1	–	4	–	0	2	–	7	–	0
$ – Conference champion

1938 Kansas Collegiate Athletic Conference football standings
	Conf.					Overall
Team	W		L		T	W		L		T
Ottawa $	5	–	0	–	0	8	–	0	–	0
Bethany (KS)	3	–	2	–	0	4	–	4	–	0
College of Emporia	3	–	2	–	0	4	–	4	–	1
McPherson	2	–	3	–	0	3	–	5	–	1
Kansas Wesleyan	1	–	4	–	0	2	–	6	–	1
Baker	1	–	4	–	0	2	–	7	–	0
$ – Conference champion

1939 Kansas Collegiate Athletic Conference football standings
	Conf.					Overall
Team	W		L		T	W		L		T
Ottawa $	5	–	0	–	1	6	–	1	–	1
Bethany (KS)	3	–	2	–	1	3	–	5	–	1
Baker	2	–	2	–	2	3	–	4	–	2
Kansas Wesleyan	2	–	2	–	2	2	–	3	–	4
College of Emporia	2	–	3	–	1	2	–	5	–	2
McPherson	1	–	3	–	2	4	–	3	–	2
Bethel (KS)	1	–	4	–	1	3	–	5	–	1
$ – Conference champion

1940 Kansas Collegiate Athletic Conference football standings
	Conf.					Overall
Team	W		L		T	W		L		T
Kansas Wesleyan $	5	–	0	–	1	6	–	1	–	2
Baker	4	–	2	–	0	5	–	3	–	0
Ottawa	3	–	2	–	1	4	–	4	–	1
Bethany (KS)	3	–	3	–	0	4	–	5	–	0
College of Emporia	2	–	4	–	0	2	–	6	–	1
McPherson	2	–	4	–	0	2	–	7	–	0
Bethel (KS)	1	–	5	–	0	4	–	6	–	0
$ – Conference champion

1941 Kansas Collegiate Athletic Conference football standings
	Conf.					Overall
Team	W		L		T	W		L		T
Baker $	5	–	1	–	0	7	–	2	–	0
Bethel (KS)	4	–	1	–	1	6	–	1	–	1
Ottawa	4	–	1	–	1	6	–	1	–	1
Kansas Wesleyan	4	–	2	–	0	4	–	3	–	0
Bethany (KS)	1	–	5	–	0	1	–	7	–	0
College of Emporia	1	–	5	–	0	1	–	8	–	0
McPherson	1	–	5	–	0	1	–	8	–	0
$ – Conference champion

1942 Kansas Collegiate Athletic Conference football standings
	Conf.					Overall
Team	W		L		T	W		L		T
Baker $	6	–	0	–	0	7	–	0	–	0
Ottawa	4	–	1	–	1	5	–	1	–	1
Kansas Wesleyan	3	–	1	–	2	5	–	4	–	2
Bethany (KS)	3	–	2	–	1	3	–	3	–	1
McPherson	1	–	4	–	1	1	–	4	–	3
College of Emporia	1	–	4	–	1	1	–	5	–	1
Bethel (KS)	0	–	6	–	0	2	–	6	–	1
$ – Conference champion

1946 Kansas Collegiate Athletic Conference football standings
	Conf.					Overall
Team	W		L		T	W		L		T
Bethany (KS) $	5	–	1	–	0	6	–	2	–	0
Ottawa	4	–	1	–	1	7	–	1	–	1
Baker	4	–	1	–	1	5	–	3	–	1
McPherson	3	–	2	–	1	4	–	3	–	1
Kansas Wesleyan	2	–	3	–	1	3	–	4	–	2
Bethel (KS)	1	–	5	–	0	2	–	6	–	0
College of Emporia	0	–	6	–	0	1	–	8	–	0
$ – Conference champion

1947 Kansas Collegiate Athletic Conference football standings
	Conf.					Overall
Team	W		L		T	W		L		T
Ottawa $	6	–	0	–	0	6	–	2	–	1
Baker	4	–	1	–	1	5	–	3	–	1
Bethany (KS)	4	–	2	–	0	4	–	5	–	0
Kansas Wesleyan	3	–	2	–	1	4	–	4	–	1
Bethel (KS)	1	–	4	–	1	2	–	5	–	1
College of Emporia	1	–	4	–	1	2	–	6	–	1
McPherson	0	–	6	–	0	1	–	6	–	0
$ – Conference champion

1948 Kansas Collegiate Athletic Conference football standings
	Conf.					Overall
Team	W		L		T	W		L		T
Ottawa $	6	–	0	–	0	7	–	3	–	0
Bethany (KS)	5	–	1	–	0	6	–	3	–	0
College of Emporia	3	–	3	–	0	4	–	3	–	1
Kansas Wesleyan	3	–	3	–	0	5	–	4	–	0
Baker	3	–	3	–	0	4	–	5	–	0
Bethel (KS)	1	–	5	–	0	2	–	7	–	0
McPherson	0	–	6	–	0	0	–	8	–	0
$ – Conference champion

1949 Kansas Collegiate Athletic Conference football standings
	Conf.					Overall
Team	W		L		T	W		L		T
Baker $	5	–	1	–	0	7	–	2	–	0
Ottawa	4	–	2	–	0	5	–	4	–	0
Bethany (KS)	4	–	2	–	0	5	–	4	–	0
Kansas Wesleyan	3	–	3	–	0	3	–	6	–	0
College of Emporia	3	–	3	–	0	4	–	5	–	0
Bethel (KS)	2	–	4	–	0	3	–	5	–	0
McPherson	0	–	6	–	0	1	–	8	–	0
$ – Conference champion

1950 Kansas Collegiate Athletic Conference football standings
	Conf.					Overall
Team	W		L		T	W		L		T
Ottawa $	6	–	0	–	0	7	–	2	–	0
Baker	5	–	1	–	0	6	–	3	–	0
Kansas Wesleyan	3	–	2	–	1	3	–	6	–	1
Bethany (KS)	2	–	3	–	1	3	–	5	–	1
McPherson	2	–	4	–	0	3	–	5	–	0
College of Emporia	2	–	4	–	0	2	–	7	–	0
Bethel (KS)	0	–	6	–	0	1	–	8	–	0
$ – Conference champion

1951 Kansas Collegiate Athletic Conference football standings
	Conf.					Overall
Team	W		L		T	W		L		T
College of Emporia $	6	–	0	–	0	8	–	0	–	0
McPherson	5	–	1	–	0	7	–	2	–	0
Ottawa	4	–	2	–	0	6	–	3	–	0
Kansas Wesleyan	3	–	3	–	0	5	–	4	–	0
Bethany (KS)	2	–	4	–	0	4	–	5	–	0
Baker	1	–	5	–	0	2	–	7	–	0
Bethel (KS)	0	–	6	–	0	1	–	8	–	0
$ – Conference champion

1952 Kansas Collegiate Athletic Conference football standings
	Conf.					Overall
Team	W		L		T	W		L		T
McPherson $	6	–	0	–	0	8	–	0	–	1
Ottawa	5	–	1	–	0	8	–	1	–	0
Bethany (KS)	3	–	3	–	0	5	–	4	–	0
College of Emporia	2	–	3	–	1	3	–	5	–	1
Baker	2	–	3	–	1	2	–	5	–	1
Kansas Wesleyan	2	–	4	–	0	5	–	4	–	0
Bethel (KS)	0	–	6	–	0	2	–	7	–	0
$ – Conference champion

1953 Kansas Collegiate Athletic Conference football standings
	Conf.					Overall
Team	W		L		T	W		L		T
College of Emporia $	7	–	0	–	0	8	–	0	–	0
McPherson	6	–	1	–	0	8	–	1	–	0
Bethany (KS)	4	–	3	–	0	4	–	4	–	0
Kansas Wesleyan	3	–	3	–	1	3	–	5	–	1
Baker	3	–	4	–	0	4	–	5	–	0
Friends	2	–	5	–	0	4	–	5	–	0
Ottawa	2	–	5	–	0	3	–	6	–	0
Bethel (KS)	0	–	6	–	1	1	–	7	–	1
$ – Conference champion

1954 Kansas Collegiate Athletic Conference football standings
	Conf.					Overall
Team	W		L		T	W		L		T
College of Emporia $	7	–	0	–	0	9	–	1	–	0
Ottawa	5	–	1	–	1	6	–	2	–	1
Kansas Wesleyan	4	–	2	–	1	5	–	3	–	1
Bethel (KS)	4	–	2	–	1	4	–	3	–	1
McPherson	3	–	4	–	0	3	–	6	–	0
Baker	2	–	5	–	0	3	–	6	–	0
Bethany (KS)	1	–	5	–	1	1	–	6	–	1
Friends	0	–	7	–	0	1	–	8	–	0
$ – Conference champion

1955 Kansas Collegiate Athletic Conference football standings
	Conf.					Overall
Team	W		L		T	W		L		T
College of Emporia $	7	–	0	–	0	9	–	0	–	0
Kansas Wesleyan	5	–	2	–	0	6	–	3	–	0
McPherson	5	–	2	–	0	5	–	3	–	0
Baker	4	–	3	–	0	4	–	5	–	0
Bethel (KS)	4	–	3	–	0	4	–	5	–	0
Ottawa	2	–	5	–	0	3	–	6	–	0
Bethany (KS)	1	–	6	–	0	1	–	8	–	0
Friends	0	–	7	–	0	0	–	8	–	0
$ – Conference champion
