= 1917 College of Emporia Fighting Presbies football team =

American college football season

1917 College of Emporia Fighting Presbies football
- Conference: Kansas Collegiate Athletic Conference
- Record: 6–2 (6–2 KCAC)
- Head coach: Raymond McCrory (1st season)

1917 Kansas Collegiate Athletic Conference football standings
	Conf.					Overall
Team	W		L		T	W		L		T
Hays Normal $	6	–	0	–	0	7	–	0	–	0
Kansas State Normal	5	–	0	–	1	5	–	3	–	1
College of Emporia	6	–	2	–	0	6	–	2	–	0
Southwestern (KS)	6	–	3	–	0	6	–	4	–	0
St. Mary's (KS)	4	–	2	–	0	6	–	3	–	0
Pittsburg Normal	3	–	2	–	1	4	–	3	–	2
Fairmount	3	–	3	–	2	3	–	3	–	2
Friends	3	–	3	–	1	3	–	5	–	1
Baker	3	–	4	–	1	3	–	5	–	1
Ottawa	2	–	4	–	1	2	–	5	–	1
Bethany (KS)	3	–	6	–	0	3	–	7	–	0
Cooper	2	–	5	–	1	2	–	5	–	1
Washburn	2	–	5	–	2	2	–	6	–	2
Midland	0	–	4	–	0	4	–	5	–	0
Kansas Wesleyan	0	–	6	–	0	1	–	8	–	0
$ – Conference champion

The 1917 College of Emporia Fighting Presbies football team represented the College of Emporia as a member of the Kansas Collegiate Athletic Conference (KCAC) during the 1917 college football season. Led by Raymond McCrory in hsi first and only season as head coach, the Presbies compiled an overall record of 6–2 with an identical mark in conference play, placing third in the KCAC.

McCrory, a graduate of the University of Wisconsin, was hired in the summer of 1917 as physical director and athletic coach at the College of Emporia.

== Schedule ==
Date	Opponent	Site	Result	Source
October 5	at Baker	Baldwin City, KS	W 14–0	
October 19	at Southwestern (KS)	Winfield, KS	L 14–16	
October 26	Fairmount	Emporia, KS	W 35–0	
November 2	Ottawa (KS)	Emporia, KS	W 33–6	
November 9	at Bethany (KS)	Lindsborg, KS	W 16–0	
November 15	at Cooper	Sterling, KS	W 26–0	
November 22	Washburn	Emporia, KS	W 16–0	
November 29	Kansas State Normal	Emporia, KS	L 0–14	
