= College of Emporia Fighting Presbies football, 1900–1909 =

American college football seasons

The College of Emporia Fighting Presbies football program from 1900 to 1909 represented the College of Emporia—in its second decade of college football competition.

== 1900 ==
1900 College of Emporia Fighting Presbies football
- Conference: Independent
- Record: 0–1
- Head coach: Unknown (1st season)

The 1900 College of Emporia Fighting Presbies football team represented College of Emporia as an independent during the 1900 college football season. The Presbies compiled a 0–1 record.

=== Schedule ===
Opponent	Site	Result	Source
Kansas State Normal		W 5–0	

== 1901 ==
1901 College of Emporia Fighting Presbies football
- Conference: Independent
- Record: 2–3
- Head coach: Horace Botsford (1st season)

The 1901 College of Emporia Fighting Presbies football team represented College of Emporia as an independent during the 1901 college football season. Led by Horace Botsford in his first and final season as head coach, the team compiled a record of 2–3.

=== Schedule ===
Date	Opponent	Site	Result	Source
October 14	at Kansas State	Manhattan, KS	L 0–11	
October 21	vs. Kansas State Normal	Mit-way Park; Emporia, KS	L 0–11	
November 4	at Bethany (KS)	Lindsborg, KS	L 0–30	
November 11	Kansas State	Emporia, KS	W 11–0	
November 19	Kansas State Normal	?; Emporia, KS	W 6–0	

== 1902 ==
1902 College of Emporia Fighting Presbies football
- Conference: Independent
- Record: 3–2
- Head coach: Daniel C. Schaffner (1st season)

The 1902 College of Emporia Fighting Presbies football team represented College of Emporia as an independent during the 1902 college football season. In their first and final season under head coach Daniel C. Schaffner, the team compiled a record of 3–2.

=== Schedule ===
Date	Opponent	Site	Result	Source
October 20	at Washburn	Topeka, KS	L 5–17	
November 28	Cooper	Emporia, KS	W 15–5	
	Kansas State Normal		W 12–6	
	Kansas State Normal		L 0–5	
	Haskell JV		W 22–0	

== 1903 ==
1903 College of Emporia Fighting Presbies football
- Conference: Independent
- Record: 3–6
- Head coach: Bert Nichols (1st season)
- Captain: L. Eidson

The 1903 College of Emporia Fighting Presbies football team represented College of Emporia as an independent during the 1903 college football season. In their first season under head coach Bert Nichols, the team compiled a record of 3–6.

=== Schedule ===
Date	Time	Opponent	Site	Result	Source
September 28		at Kansas	McCook Field; Lawrence, KS	L 0–34	
October 10		at Washburn	Washburn Field; Topeka, KS	L 0–47	
October 19		Kansas State Normal	College of Emporia grounds; Emporia, KS	L 0–12	
October 26		at St. Mary's (KS)	St. Marys, KS	L 0–27	
October 30		Friends	Emporia, KS	W 10–0	
November 9	2:30 p.m.	at Haskell second team	Haskell Field; Lawrence, KS	L 0–6	
November 16		vs. Kansas State Normal	Mit-Way Park; Emporia, KS	L 6–20	
November 21		at Kansas State	Athletic Park; Manhattan, KS	W 11–0	
November 27		Cooper	Emporia, KS	W 23–6	

== 1904 ==
1904 College of Emporia Fighting Presbies football
- Conference: Independent
- Record: 0–8
- Head coach: Bert Nichols (2nd season)

The 1904 College of Emporia Fighting Presbies football team represented College of Emporia as an independent during the 1904 college football season. In their second and final season under head coach Bert Nichols, the team compiled a record of 0–8.

=== Schedule ===
Date	Opponent	Site	Result	Source
	Kansas State Normal		L 2–19	
September 24	at Kansas	McCook Field; Lawrence, KS	L 0–6	
October 1	Washburn	C. of E. field; Emporia, KS	L 0–10	
October 14	vs. Kansas State Normal	Mit-Way Park; Emporia, KS	L 0–16	
October 20	at Ottawa (KS)	Ottawa, KS	L 5–6	
October 24	Haskell second team	Emporia, KS	L 15–18	
October 31	at St. Mary's (KS)	St. Marys, KS	L 6–11	
November 4	at Fairmount	Wichita, KS	L 0–50	
November 15	Ottawa (KS)	C. of E. field; Emporia, KS	L 6–17	
