= 1918 College of Emporia Fighting Presbies football team =

American college football season

1918 College of Emporia Fighting Presbies football

KCAC champion
- Conference: Kansas Collegiate Athletic Conference
- Record: 6–0 ( KCAC)
- Head coach: Gwinn Henry (1st season)

The 1918 College of Emporia Fighting Presbies football team was an American football team that represented the College of Emporia during the 1918 college football season. The team was made up of players participating in the school's wartime Student Army Training Corps and was sometimes referred to as the S.A.T.C. team. It posted a perfect 6–0 record and won the Kansas Collegiate Athletic Conference.

The Fighting Presbies were led by first-year head coach Gwinn Henry. "The style of snappy offensive (sic) which he has had adapted to his light team has enabled them to defeat much heavier elevens." The average weight in the backfield was just 140 pounds. 1918 was the first year for the tradition of the Gwinn Henry Cemetery, conducting a faux burial of the opposing team after a win.

Harold Grant was a member of the team.

== Schedule ==
Date	Opponent	Site	Result	Source
October 4	at Fairmount	Wichita, KS	W 19–0	
October 11	Baker	Emporia, KS	W 7–0	
November 4	Ottawa	Emporia, KS	W 22–0	
November 8	Bethany (KS)	Emporia, KS	W 23–6	
November 23	at Cooper	Sterling, KS	W 14–0	
December 6	at Kansas State Normal	Normal Field; Emporia, KS	W 17–7	
