= 1919 College of Emporia Fighting Presbies football team =

American college football season

1919 College of Emporia Fighting Presbies football

KCAC champion
- Conference: Kansas Collegiate Athletic Conference
- Record: 8–0 (8–0 KCAC)
- Head coach: Gwinn Henry (2nd season)

1919 Kansas Collegiate Athletic Conference football standings
	Conf.					Overall
Team	W		L		T	W		L		T
College of Emporia $	8	–	0	–	0	8	–	0	–	0
Pittsburg Normal	5	–	0	–	1	7	–	2	–	1
Washburn	7	–	1	–	0	7	–	1	–	1
Southwestern (KS)	6	–	3	–	0	6	–	4	–	0
St. Mary's (KS)	3	–	2	–	0	6	–	2	–	0
Baker	3	–	2	–	1	4	–	4	–	1
Friends	3	–	4	–	0	4	–	5	–	0
Hays Normal	3	–	4	–	0	3	–	6	–	0
Kansas Wesleyan	2	–	4	–	0	3	–	5	–	0
Ottawa	2	–	4	–	2	2	–	4	–	2
Bethany (KS)	2	–	5	–	1	2	–	5	–	1
Fairmount	2	–	6	–	2	2	–	6	–	2
Kansas State Normal	1	–	4	–	2	1	–	6	–	2
Cooper	0	–	8	–	1	0	–	8	–	1
$ – Conference champion

The 1919 College of Emporia Fighting Presbies football team was an American football team that represented the Emporia College as a member of the Kansas Collegiate Athletic Conference KCAC) during the 1919 college football season. Led by second-year head coach Gwinn Henry, the Fighting Presbies posted a perfect 8–0 record, shut out seven of eight opponent, and won the KCAC title. The team's roster featured Harold Grant and L. T. Harr.

== Schedule ==
Date	Opponent	Site	Result	Source
October 3	Fairmount	Emporia, KS	W 20–0	
October 11	at Baker	Baldwin City, KS	W 6–0	
October 17	at Southwestern (KS)	Winfield, KS	W 14–0	
October 24	Friends	Emporia, KS	W 26–0	
October 31	Ottawa (KS)	Emporia, KS	W 32–6	
November 7	at Bethany (KS)	Lindsborg, KS	W 19–0	
November 14	Washburn	Emporia, KS	W 7–0	
November 27	Kansas State Normal	Emporia, KS	W 14–0	
