= 1925 College of Emporia Fighting Presbies football team =

American college football season

1925 College of Emporia Fighting Presbies football

KCAC champion
- Conference: Kansas Collegiate Athletic Conference
- Record: 7–0 (7–0 KCAC)
- Head coach: Harold Grant (3rd season)

1925 Kansas Collegiate Athletic Conference football standings
	Conf.					Overall
Team	W		L		T	W		L		T
College of Emporia +	7	–	0	–	0	7	–	0	–	0
Bethany (KS) +	7	–	0	–	0	7	–	0	–	0
Fairmount	3	–	0	–	4	3	–	1	–	4
Pittsburg Teachers	5	–	2	–	0	5	–	2	–	1
Emporia Teachers	3	–	2	–	1	4	–	3	–	1
Kansas Wesleyan	3	–	2	–	1	4	–	2	–	1
Southwestern (KS)	4	–	3	–	0	5	–	3	–	0
Baker	3	–	3	–	1	4	–	3	–	1
St. Mary's (KS)	3	–	3	–	1	4	–	3	–	1
Washburn	2	–	4	–	1	2	–	4	–	1
Bethel (KS)	1	–	4	–	0	2	–	4	–	0
Hays Teachers	1	–	4	–	1	2	–	4	–	1
Ottawa	1	–	4	–	2	1	–	5	–	2
Friends	1	–	5	–	1	2	–	5	–	1
Sterling	1	–	5	–	1	1	–	5	–	1
McPherson	0	–	4	–	2	1	–	4	–	2
+ – Conference co-champions

The 1925 College of Emporia Fighting Presbies football team was an American football team that represented the Emporia College as a member of the Kansas Collegiate Athletic Conference KCAC) during the 1925 college football season. The team posted an undefeated 7–0 record and was led by former player Harold Grant at head coach.

== Schedule ==
Date	Opponent	Site	Result
October 10	at Southwestern (KS)	Winfield, KS	W 26–0
October 17	Washburn	Emporia, KS	W 16–0
October 23	at Sterling	Sterling, KS	W 16–7
October 31	Baker	Emporia, KS	W 9–0
November 6	Pittsburg Teachers	Emporia, KS	W 12–7
November 13	at Ottawa (KS)	Ottawa, KS	W 28–0
November 26	Emporia Teachers	Emporia, KS	W 14–12
