= 1941 College of Emporia Fighting Presbies football team =

American college football season

1941 College of Emporia Fighting Presbies football
- Conference: Kansas Collegiate Athletic Conference
- Record: 1–8 (1–5 KCAC)
- Head coach: Henry Brock (1st season)

1941 Kansas Collegiate Athletic Conference football standings
	Conf.					Overall
Team	W		L		T	W		L		T
Baker $	5	–	1	–	0	7	–	2	–	0
Bethel (KS)	4	–	1	–	1	6	–	1	–	1
Ottawa	4	–	1	–	1	6	–	1	–	1
Kansas Wesleyan	4	–	2	–	0	4	–	3	–	0
Bethany (KS)	1	–	5	–	0	1	–	7	–	0
College of Emporia	1	–	5	–	0	1	–	8	–	0
McPherson	1	–	5	–	0	1	–	8	–	0
$ – Conference champion

The 1941 College of Emporia Fighting Presbies football team represented College of Emporia as a member of the Kansas Collegiate Athletic Conference (KCAC) during the 1941 college football season. Led by Henry Brock in his first and only season as head coach, the Fighting Presbies compiled an overall record of 1–8 with a mark of 1–5 in conference play, placing in a three-way tie for fifth in the KCAC.

== Schedule ==
Date	Opponent	Site	Result	Source
September 19	at Washburn	Topeka, KS	L 0–26	
September 26	Bethany (KS)	Emporia, KS	W 14–0	
October 2	at Southwestern (KS)	Winfield, KS	L 0–33	
October 11	at Fort Hays State	Hays, KS	L 0–57	
October 18	at Baker	Baldwin City, KS	L 0–17	
October 24	Kansas Wesleyan	Emporia, KS	L 6–24	
November 1	at McPherson	McPherson, KS	L 0–7	
November 7	Ottawa (KS)	Emporia, KS	L 0–14	
November 15	at Bethel (KS)	North Newton, KS	L 0–44	
