= 1950 College of Emporia Fighting Presbies football team =

American college football season

1950 College of Emporia Fighting Presbies football
- Conference: Kansas Collegiate Athletic Conference
- Record: 2–7 (2–4 KCAC)
- Head coach: Wayne J. McConnell (1st season)
- Home stadium: Schaffner Field

1950 Kansas Collegiate Athletic Conference football standings
	Conf.					Overall
Team	W		L		T	W		L		T
Ottawa $	6	–	0	–	0	7	–	2	–	0
Baker	5	–	1	–	0	6	–	3	–	0
Kansas Wesleyan	3	–	2	–	1	3	–	6	–	1
Bethany (KS)	2	–	3	–	1	3	–	5	–	1
McPherson	2	–	4	–	0	3	–	5	–	0
College of Emporia	2	–	4	–	0	2	–	7	–	0
Bethel (KS)	0	–	6	–	0	1	–	8	–	0
$ – Conference champion

The 1950 College of Emporia Fighting Presbies football team represented the College of Emporia as a member of the Kansas Collegiate Athletic Conference (KCAC) during the 1950 college football season. In their first season under head coach Wayne J. McConnell, the Presbies compiled an overall record of 2–7 record with a mark of 2–4 in conference play, tying for fifth place in the KCAC.

== Schedule ==
Date	Opponent	Site	Result	Source
September 15	Missouri Valley*	Emporia, KS	L 0–48	
September 22	at Central Missouri State*	Warrensburg, MO	L 21–26	
September 29	at Baker	Baldwin City, KS	L 0–13	
October 6	Bethany (KS)	Emporia, KS	L 7–12	
October 13	McPherson	Emporia, KS	W 28–20	
October 21	at Northwest Missouri State*	Maryville, MO	L 7–27	
October 27	at Kansas Wesleyan	Salina, KS	L 13–40	
November 4	at Bethel (KS)	North Newton, KS	W 14–0	
November 10	Ottawa (KS)	Emporia, KS	L 7–45	
*Non-conference game
