= 1947 College of Emporia Fighting Presbies football team =

American college football season

1947 College of Emporia Fighting Presbies football
- Conference: Kansas Collegiate Athletic Conference
- Record: 2–6–1 (1–4–1 KCAC)
- Head coach: Murray Brown (1st season)

1947 Kansas Collegiate Athletic Conference football standings
	Conf.					Overall
Team	W		L		T	W		L		T
Ottawa $	6	–	0	–	0	6	–	2	–	1
Baker	4	–	1	–	1	5	–	3	–	1
Bethany (KS)	4	–	2	–	0	4	–	5	–	0
Kansas Wesleyan	3	–	2	–	1	4	–	4	–	1
Bethel (KS)	1	–	4	–	1	2	–	5	–	1
College of Emporia	1	–	4	–	1	2	–	6	–	1
McPherson	0	–	6	–	0	1	–	6	–	0
$ – Conference champion

The 1947 College of Emporia Fighting Presbies football team represented the College of Emporia as a member of the Kansas Collegiate Athletic Conference (KCAC) during the 1947 college football season. In their first season under head coach Murray Brown, the Presbies compiled an overall record of 2–6–1 with a mark of 1–4–1 in conference play, tying for fifth place in the KCAC.

== Schedule ==
Date	Opponent	Site	Result	Source
September 26	at Pittsburg State*	Brandenburg Stadium; Pittsburg, KS	L 0–21	
October 3	Bethel (KS)	Emporia, KS	T 6–6	
October 11	at McPherson	McPherson, KS	W 14–13	
October 17	Baker	Emporia, KS	L 0–17	
October 24	at Bethany (KS)	Lindsborg, KS	L 13–28	
October 31	Kansas Wesleyan	Emporia, KS	L 6–13	
November 7	Sterling*	Emporia, KS	W 14–0	
November 14	at Ottawa (KS)	Ottawa, KS	L 0–33	
November 21	at Southwestern (KS)*	Winfield, KS	L 12–18	
*Non-conference game
