= 1939 College of Emporia Fighting Presbies football team =

American college football season

1939 College of Emporia Fighting Presbies football
- Conference: Kansas Collegiate Athletic Conference
- Record: 2–5–2 (2–3–1 KCAC)
- Head coach: Lester Selves (3rd season)

1939 Kansas Collegiate Athletic Conference football standings
	Conf.					Overall
Team	W		L		T	W		L		T
Ottawa $	5	–	0	–	1	6	–	1	–	1
Bethany (KS)	3	–	2	–	1	3	–	5	–	1
Baker	2	–	2	–	2	3	–	4	–	2
Kansas Wesleyan	2	–	2	–	2	2	–	3	–	4
College of Emporia	2	–	3	–	1	2	–	5	–	2
McPherson	1	–	3	–	2	4	–	3	–	2
Bethel (KS)	1	–	4	–	1	3	–	5	–	1
$ – Conference champion

The 1939 College of Emporia Fighting Presbies football team represented College of Emporia as a member of the Kansas Collegiate Athletic Conference (KCAC) during the 1939 college football season. Led by Lester Selves in his third and final season as head coach, the Fighting Presbies compiled an overall record of 2–5–2 with a mark of 2–3–1 in conference play, placing fifth in the KCAC.

== Schedule ==
Date	Opponent	Site	Result	Source
September 22	Southwestern (KS)*	Emporia, KS	T 0–0	
September 29	at McPherson	McPherson, KS	T 0–0	
October 7	at Northeastern State*	Tahlequah, OK	L 0–25	
October 13	at Bethel (KS)	Newton, KS	W 6–0	
October 21	at Baker	Baldwin City, KS	L 6–45	
October 28	Kansas Wesleyan	Emporia, KS	L 0–9	
November 4	at Emporia State*	Emporia State University grounds; Emporia, KS	L 7–59	
November 10	at Ottawa (KS)	Ottawa, KS	L 6–21	
November 17	Bethany (KS)	Emporia, KS	W 18–0	
*Non-conference game
