= 1940 College of Emporia Fighting Presbies football team =

American college football season

1940 College of Emporia Fighting Presbies football
- Conference: Kansas Collegiate Athletic Conference
- Record: 2–6–1 (2–4 KCAC)
- Head coach: Ted Warren (1st season)

1940 Kansas Collegiate Athletic Conference football standings
	Conf.					Overall
Team	W		L		T	W		L		T
Kansas Wesleyan $	5	–	0	–	1	6	–	1	–	2
Baker	4	–	2	–	0	5	–	3	–	0
Ottawa	3	–	2	–	1	4	–	4	–	1
Bethany (KS)	3	–	3	–	0	4	–	5	–	0
College of Emporia	2	–	4	–	0	2	–	6	–	1
McPherson	2	–	4	–	0	2	–	7	–	0
Bethel (KS)	1	–	5	–	0	4	–	6	–	0
$ – Conference champion

The 1940 College of Emporia Fighting Presbies football team represented College of Emporia as a member of the Kansas Collegiate Athletic Conference (KCAC) during the 1940 college football season. Led by Ted Warren in his first and only season as head coach, the Fighting Presbies compiled an overall record of 2–6–1 with a mark of 2–4 in conference play, tying for fifth place in the KCAC.

== Schedule ==
Date	Opponent	Site	Result	Source
September 20	at Washburn*	Topeka, KS	L 0–26	
September 28	at Bethany (KS)	Lindsborg, KS	L 0–7	
October 4	at Southwestern (KS)*	Winfield, KS	T 6–6	
October 11	Emporia State*	?; Emporia, KS	L 6–47	
October 18	Baker	Emporia, KS	L 0–9	
October 25	at Kansas Wesleyan	Salina, KS	L 0–20	
November 1	McPherson	Emporia, KS	W 7–0	
November 8	at Ottawa	Ottawa, KS	L 12–14	
November 15	Bethel (KS)	Emporia, KS	W 13–7	
*Non-conference game
