= 1925 Fairmount Wheatshockers football team =

American college football season

1925 Fairmount Wheatshockers football
- Conference: Kansas Collegiate Athletic Conference
- Record: 3–1–4 (3–0–4 KCAC)
- Head coach: Leonard J. Umnus (1st season)

1925 Kansas Collegiate Athletic Conference football standings
	Conf.					Overall
Team	W		L		T	W		L		T
College of Emporia +	7	–	0	–	0	7	–	0	–	0
Bethany (KS) +	7	–	0	–	0	7	–	0	–	0
Fairmount	3	–	0	–	4	3	–	1	–	4
Pittsburg Teachers	5	–	2	–	0	5	–	2	–	1
Emporia Teachers	3	–	2	–	1	4	–	3	–	1
Kansas Wesleyan	3	–	2	–	1	4	–	2	–	1
Southwestern (KS)	4	–	3	–	0	5	–	3	–	0
Baker	3	–	3	–	1	4	–	3	–	1
St. Mary's (KS)	3	–	3	–	1	4	–	3	–	1
Washburn	2	–	4	–	1	2	–	4	–	1
Bethel (KS)	1	–	4	–	0	2	–	4	–	0
Hays Teachers	1	–	4	–	1	2	–	4	–	1
Ottawa	1	–	4	–	2	1	–	5	–	2
Friends	1	–	5	–	1	2	–	5	–	1
Sterling	1	–	5	–	1	1	–	5	–	1
McPherson	0	–	4	–	2	1	–	4	–	2
+ – Conference co-champions

The 1925 Fairmount Shockers football team was an American football team that represented Fairmount College (now known as Wichita State University) as a member of the Kansas Collegiate Athletic Conference (KCAC) during the 1925 college football season. In its first season under head coach Leonard J. Umnus, the team compiled a 3–1–4 record.

== Schedule ==
Date	Opponent	Site	Result	Attendance	Source
September 26	at Haskell*	Lawrence High School field; Lawrence, KS	L 0–39		
October 8	St. Mary's (KS)	Wichita, KS	W 12–7		
October 16	at Emporia Teachers	Emporia, KS	T 0–0		
October 24	at Baker	Baldwin City, KS	T 0–0		
October 31	at Southwestern (KS)	Winfield, KS	W 13–7		
November 6	Ottawa	Wichita, KS	T 0–0		
November 14	at Hays Teachers	Hays, KS	T 0–0		
November 26	Friends	Wichita, KS	W 9–7		
*Non-conference game
