= 1955 College of Emporia Fighting Presbies football team =

American college football season

1955 College of Emporia Fighting Presbies football

KCAC champion
- Conference: Kansas Collegiate Athletic Conference
- Record: 9–0 (7–0 KCAC)
- Head coach: Wayne J. McConnell (6th season)
- Home stadium: Schaffner Field

1955 Kansas Collegiate Athletic Conference football standings
	Conf.					Overall
Team	W		L		T	W		L		T
College of Emporia $	7	–	0	–	0	9	–	0	–	0
Kansas Wesleyan	5	–	2	–	0	6	–	3	–	0
McPherson	5	–	2	–	0	5	–	3	–	0
Baker	4	–	3	–	0	4	–	5	–	0
Bethel (KS)	4	–	3	–	0	4	–	5	–	0
Ottawa	2	–	5	–	0	3	–	6	–	0
Bethany (KS)	1	–	6	–	0	1	–	8	–	0
Friends	0	–	7	–	0	0	–	8	–	0
$ – Conference champion

The 1955 College of Emporia Fighting Presbies football team was an American football team that represented the College of Emporia as a member of the Kansas Collegiate Athletic Conference (KCAC) during the 1955 college football season. In their sixth and final year under head coach Wayne J. McConnell, the Presbies compiled a perfect 9–0 record (7–0 against KCAC opponents), won the KCAC championship, shut out seven of nine opponents, and outscored all opponents by a total of 257 to 13. Emporia won three consecutive conference titles from 1953 to 1955 and compiled a 26–1 record during those seasons.

The team played its home games at Schaffner Field in Emporia, Kansas.

== Schedule ==
Date	Opponent	Site	Result	Attendance	Source
September 16	Central Missouri State*	Schaffner Field; Emporia, KS	W 7–0		
September 23	at Friends	Wichita, KS	W 34–6		
September 30	Baker	Schaffner Field; Emporia, KS	W 26–0		
October 8	at Bethany (KS)	Lindsborg, KS	W 35–0		
October 14	at McPherson	McPherson, KS	W 26–0		
October 21	William Jewell*	Schaffner Field; Emporia, KS	W 45–0		
October 28	Kansas Wesleyan	Schaffner Field; Emporia, KS	W 39–0		
November 5	Bethel (KS)^{†}	Schaffner Field; Emporia, KS	W 20–7		
November 11	at Ottawa	Cook Field; Ottawa, KS	W 25–0		
*Non-conference game; ^{†}Homecoming
