= 1952 College of Emporia Fighting Presbies football team =

American college football season

1952 College of Emporia Fighting Presbies football
- Conference: Kansas Collegiate Athletic Conference
- Record: 3–5–1 (2–3–1 KCAC)
- Head coach: Wayne J. McConnell (3rd season)
- Home stadium: Schaffner Field

1952 Kansas Collegiate Athletic Conference football standings
	Conf.					Overall
Team	W		L		T	W		L		T
McPherson $	6	–	0	–	0	8	–	0	–	1
Ottawa	5	–	1	–	0	8	–	1	–	0
Bethany (KS)	3	–	3	–	0	5	–	4	–	0
College of Emporia	2	–	3	–	1	3	–	5	–	1
Baker	2	–	3	–	1	2	–	5	–	1
Kansas Wesleyan	2	–	4	–	0	5	–	4	–	0
Bethel (KS)	0	–	6	–	0	2	–	7	–	0
$ – Conference champion

The 1952 College of Emporia Fighting Presbies football team represented the College of Emporia as a member of the Kansas Collegiate Athletic Conference (KCAC) during the 1952 college football season. In their third season under head coach Wayne J. McConnell, the Presbies compiled an overall record of 3–5–1 record with a mark of 2–3–1 in conference play, tying for fourth place in the KCAC.

== Schedule ==
Date	Opponent	Site	Result	Attendance	Source
September 19	at Northeastern State (OK)*	Tahlequah, OK	L 7–14	1,000	
September 27	at Baker	Baldwin City, KS	T 6–6		
October 3	Bethany (KS)	Emporia, KS	L 6–7		
October 11	McPherson^{†}	Emporia, KS	L 20–26		
October 17	Sterling*	Emporia, KS	W 58–12		
October 24	at Kansas Wesleyan	Salina, KS	W 26–6		
November 1	at Bethel (KS)	Newton, KS	W 44–20		
November 8	Ottawa (KS)	Emporia, KS	L 20–26		
November 14	at Kearney State*	Kearney, NE	L 7–19		
*Non-conference game; ^{†}Homecoming
