= 1953 College of Emporia Fighting Presbies football team =

American college football season

1953 College of Emporia Fighting Presbies football

KCAC champion
- Conference: Kansas Collegiate Athletic Conference
- Record: 8–0 (7–0 KCAC)
- Head coach: Wayne J. McConnell (4th season)

1953 Kansas Collegiate Athletic Conference football standings
| | Conf. | | | | | Overall |
| Team | W | | L | | T | W | | L | | T |
|---|---|---|---|---|---|---|---|---|---|---|
| College of Emporia $ | 7 | – | 0 | – | 0 | 8 | – | 0 | – | 0 |
| McPherson | 6 | – | 1 | – | 0 | 8 | – | 1 | – | 0 |
| Bethany (KS) | 4 | – | 3 | – | 0 | 4 | – | 4 | – | 0 |
| Kansas Wesleyan | 3 | – | 3 | – | 1 | 3 | – | 5 | – | 1 |
| Baker | 3 | – | 4 | – | 0 | 4 | – | 5 | – | 0 |
| Friends | 2 | – | 5 | – | 0 | 4 | – | 5 | – | 0 |
| Ottawa | 2 | – | 5 | – | 0 | 3 | – | 6 | – | 0 |
| Bethel (KS) | 0 | – | 6 | – | 1 | 1 | – | 7 | – | 1 |
$ – Conference champion

The 1953 College of Emporia Fighting Presbies football team represented the College of Emporia as a member of the Kansas Collegiate Athletic Conference (KCAC) during the 1953 college football season. Led by fourth-year head coach Wayne J. McConnell, the Presbies compiled an overall record of 8–0 with a mark of 7–0 in conference play, winning the KCAC title.

== Schedule ==
| Date | Time | Opponent | Site | Result | Attendance | Source |
|---|---|---|---|---|---|---|
| September 19 | | at Friends | Wichita, KS | W 52–0 | 1,500 | |
| September 25 | | Baker | Emporia, KS | W 20–7 | | |
| October 3 | 2:30 p.m. | at Bethany (KS) | Lindsborg, KS | W 26–7 | 4,000 | |
| October 9 | | at McPherson | McPherson, KS | W 28–21 | | |
| October 24 | | Kansas Wesleyan | Emporia, KS | W 41–7 | | |
| October 29 | | Bethel (KS) | Emporia, KS | W 59–14 | | |
| November 6 | | at Ottawa (KS) | Ottawa, KS | W 34–6 | | |
| November 13 | | Kearney State* | Emporia, KS | W 32–19 | | |
*Non-conference game; All times are in Central time
