= 1954 College of Emporia Fighting Presbies football team =

American college football season

1954 College of Emporia Fighting Presbies football

KCAC champion

Mineral Water Bowl, L 14–20 vs. Hastings
- Conference: Kansas Collegiate Athletic Conference
- Record: 9–1 (7–0 KCAC)
- Head coach: Wayne J. McConnell (5th season)

1954 Kansas Collegiate Athletic Conference football standings
	Conf.					Overall
Team	W		L		T	W		L		T
College of Emporia $	7	–	0	–	0	9	–	1	–	0
Ottawa	5	–	1	–	1	6	–	2	–	1
Kansas Wesleyan	4	–	2	–	1	5	–	3	–	1
Bethel (KS)	4	–	2	–	1	4	–	3	–	1
McPherson	3	–	4	–	0	3	–	6	–	0
Baker	2	–	5	–	0	3	–	6	–	0
Bethany (KS)	1	–	5	–	1	1	–	6	–	1
Friends	0	–	7	–	0	1	–	8	–	0
$ – Conference champion

The 1954 College of Emporia Fighting Presbies football team represented the College of Emporia as a member of the Kansas Collegiate Athletic Conference (KCAC) during the 1954 college football season. Led by fifth-year head Wayne J. McConnell, the Presbies compiled an overall record of 9–1 record with a mark of 7–0 in conference play, winning the KCAC title for the second consecutive season. The College of Emporia was invited to the Mineral Water Bowl, where the team lost to Hastings.

== Schedule ==
Date	Time	Opponent	Site	Result	Attendance	Source
September 17		Friends	Emporia, KS	W 28–0		
September 24		at Baker	Baldwin City, KS	W 49–6		
October 1		Bethany (KS)	Emporia, KS	W 58–7		
October 9		McPherson	Emporia, KS	W 47–12		
October 16		at William Jewell*	Liberty, MO	W 41–7		
October 23		Kansas Wesleyan	Salina, KS	W 20–19		
October 29		Bethel (KS)	North Newton, KS	W 41–7		
November 5		Ottawa (KS)	Emporia, KS	W 44–7		
November 11		Northwestern State (OK)*	Emporia, KS	W 61–19		
November 25	2:00 p.m.	vs. Hastings*	Excelsior Springs, MO (Mineral Water Bowl)	L 14–20	4,000	
*Non-conference game; All times are in Central time
