= 1948 College of Emporia Fighting Presbies football team =

American college football season

1948 College of Emporia Fighting Presbies football
- Conference: Kansas Collegiate Athletic Conference
- Record: 4–3–1 (3–3 KCAC)
- Head coach: Murray Brown (2nd season)

1948 Kansas Collegiate Athletic Conference football standings
	Conf.					Overall
Team	W		L		T	W		L		T
Ottawa $	6	–	0	–	0	7	–	3	–	0
Bethany (KS)	5	–	1	–	0	6	–	3	–	0
College of Emporia	3	–	3	–	0	4	–	3	–	1
Kansas Wesleyan	3	–	3	–	0	5	–	4	–	0
Baker	3	–	3	–	0	4	–	5	–	0
Bethel (KS)	1	–	5	–	0	2	–	7	–	0
McPherson	0	–	6	–	0	0	–	8	–	0
$ – Conference champion

The 1948 College of Emporia Fighting Presbies football team represented the College of Emporia as a member of the Kansas Collegiate Athletic Conference (KCAC) during the 1948 college football season. In their second season under head coach Murray Brown, the Presbies compiled an overall record of 4–3–1 record with a mark of 3–3 in conference play, placing in a three-way tie for third in the KCAC.

== Schedule ==
Date	Opponent	Site	Result	Source
September 24	Pittsburg State*	Emporia, KS	T 7–7	
October 1	William Jewell*	Emporia, KS	W 19–7	
October 10	McPherson	Emporia, KS	W 44–0	
October 16	at Baker	Baldwin City, KS	W 6–3	
October 22	Bethany (KS)	Emporia, KS	L 13–14	
October 29	at Kansas Wesleyan	Salina, KS	L 0–2	
November 5	at Bethel (KS)	North Newton, KS	W 14–6	
November 12	Ottawa (KS)	Emporia, KS	L 13–26	
*Non-conference game
