= 1951 College of Emporia Fighting Presbies football team =

American college football season

1951 College of Emporia Fighting Presbies football

KCAC champion
- Conference: Kansas Collegiate Athletic Conference
- Record: 8–0 (6–0 KCAC)
- Head coach: Wayne J. McConnell (2nd season)
- Home stadium: Schaffner Field

1951 Kansas Collegiate Athletic Conference football standings
	Conf.					Overall
Team	W		L		T	W		L		T
College of Emporia $	6	–	0	–	0	8	–	0	–	0
McPherson	5	–	1	–	0	7	–	2	–	0
Ottawa	4	–	2	–	0	6	–	3	–	0
Kansas Wesleyan	3	–	3	–	0	5	–	4	–	0
Bethany (KS)	2	–	4	–	0	4	–	5	–	0
Baker	1	–	5	–	0	2	–	7	–	0
Bethel (KS)	0	–	6	–	0	1	–	8	–	0
$ – Conference champion

The 1951 College of Emporia Fighting Presbies Football Team represented the College of Emporia as a member of the Kansas Collegiate Athletic Conference (KCAC) during the 1951 college football season. Led by second-year head coach Wayne J. McConnell, the Presbies compiled an overall record of 8–0 with a mark of 6–0 in conference play, winning the KCAC title. They outscored opponents by a total of 259 to 72. The team played home games at Schaffner Field in Emporia, Kansas.

== Schedule ==
Date	Opponent	Site	Result	Attendance	Source
September 21	at Central Missouri State*	Warrensburg, MO	W 12–7		
September 28	Baker	Schaffner Field; Emporia, KS	W 42–7		
October 5	at Bethany (KS)	Lindsborg, KS	W 33–0		
October 13	at McPherson	McPherson, KS	W 30–19	4,500	
October 27	Kansas Wesleyan^{†}	Schaffner Field; Emporia, KS	W 27–14		
November 2	Bethel (KS)	Schaffner Field; Emporia, KS	W 41–6		
November 9	at Ottawa (KS)	Ottawa, KS	W 21–13		
November 17	at Sterling*	Sterling, KS	W 53–6		
*Non-conference game; ^{†}Homecoming
