= List of Kansas Collegiate Athletic Conference football standings (1997–present) =

This is a list of yearly Kansas Collegiate Athletic Conference football standings.

== Kansas Collegiate Athletic Conference standings ==
=== NAIA (1997–present) ===
1997 Kansas Collegiate Athletic Conference football standings
	Conf.			Overall
Team	W		L	W		L
No. 12 Ottawa +^	7	–	1	9	–	2
No. 15 Southwestern (KS) +^	7	–	1	8	–	3
No. 20 Bethany (KS)	6	–	2	7	–	2
McPherson	4	–	4	6	–	4
Bethel (KS)	4	–	4	5	–	5
Friends	4	–	4	4	–	6
Sterling	2	–	6	3	–	7
Kansas Wesleyan	2	–	6	2	–	7
Tabor	0	–	8	1	–	9
$ – Conference champion; ^ – NAIA playoff participant; Rankings from NAIA poll

1998 Kansas Collegiate Athletic Conference football standings
	Conf.			Overall
Team	W		L	W		L
No. 3 Southwestern (KS) $^	7	–	1	9	–	2
No. 19 Ottawa	6	–	2	8	–	2
Bethany (KS)	5	–	3	6	–	3
Kansas Wesleyan	4	–	4	5	–	4
Bethel (KS)	4	–	4	5	–	5
McPherson	4	–	4	5	–	5
Sterling	3	–	5	4	–	6
Friends	2	–	6	2	–	8
Tabor	1	–	7	1	–	9
$ – Conference champion; ^ – NAIA playoff participant; Rankings from NAIA poll

1999 Kansas Collegiate Athletic Conference football standings
	Conf.			Overall
Team	W		L	W		L
No. 13 Bethany (KS) +^	7	–	1	8	–	2
No. 17 Southwestern (KS) +	7	–	1	8	–	3
McPherson	5	–	3	7	–	3
Ottawa	5	–	3	6	–	3
Sterling	4	–	4	5	–	5
Friends	4	–	4	4	–	6
Bethel (KS)	2	–	6	3	–	7
Kansas Wesleyan	2	–	6	2	–	7
Tabor	0	–	8	0	–	10
+ – Conference co-champions; ^ – NAIA playoff participant; Rankings from NAIA Coaches' Poll

2000 Kansas Collegiate Athletic Conference football standings
	Conf.			Overall
Team	W		L	W		L
No. 14 Ottawa $^	9	–	0	9	–	2
No. 22 Bethel (KS)	7	–	2	8	–	2
Bethany (KS)	6	–	3	7	–	3
No. T–24 Kansas Wesleyan	6	–	3	7	–	4
Southwestern (KS)	6	–	3	6	–	4
Sterling	4	–	5	4	–	6
Friends	3	–	6	3	–	7
Tabor	3	–	6	3	–	7
McPherson	1	–	8	1	–	8
Saint Mary (KS)	0	–	9	0	–	9
$ – Conference champion; ^ – NAIA playoff participant; Rankings from NAIA Coaches' Poll

2001 Kansas Collegiate Athletic Conference football standings
	Conf.			Overall
Team	W		L	W		L
No. 19 Bethany (KS) +	8	–	1	8	–	1
No. 17 Kansas Wesleyan +^	8	–	1	8	–	3
Ottawa	6	–	3	6	–	4
Southwestern (KS)	6	–	3	6	–	4
Friends	5	–	4	5	–	4
Tabor	4	–	5	5	–	5
Sterling	4	–	5	4	–	6
McPherson	2	–	7	3	–	7
Saint Mary (KS)	1	–	8	1	–	8
Bethel (KS)	1	–	8	1	–	9
+ – Conference co-champions; ^ – NAIA playoff participant; Rankings from NAIA Coaches' Poll

2002 Kansas Collegiate Athletic Conference football standings
	Conf.			Overall
Team	W		L	W		L
No. 18 Kansas Wesleyan $^	8	–	1	8	–	2
Bethany (KS)	6	–	3	6	–	3
McPherson	5	–	4	6	–	4
Tabor	5	–	4	6	–	4
Friends	5	–	4	5	–	4
Saint Mary (KS)	5	–	4	5	–	4
Ottawa	5	–	4	5	–	5
Southwestern (KS)	5	–	4	5	–	5
Bethel (KS)	1	–	8	1	–	8
Sterling	0	–	9	0	–	10
$ – Conference champion; ^ – NAIA playoff participant; Rankings from NAIA Coaches' Poll

2003 Kansas Collegiate Athletic Conference football standings
	Conf.			Overall
Team	W		L	W		L
No. 14 Ottawa $^	9	–	0	9	–	2
No. 17 Tabor ^	8	–	1	9	–	2
McPherson	5	–	4	6	–	4
Bethany (KS)	5	–	4	5	–	4
Southwestern (KS)	5	–	4	5	–	5
Kansas Wesleyan	4	–	5	4	–	6
Bethel (KS)	4	–	5	4	–	5
Friends	3	–	6	3	–	6
Saint Mary (KS)	2	–	7	2	–	8
Sterling	0	–	9	0	–	10
$ – Conference champion; ^ – NAIA playoff participant; Rankings from NAIA Coaches' Poll

2004 Kansas Collegiate Athletic Conference football standings
	Conf.			Overall
Team	W		L	W		L
No. 19 Tabor $^	8	–	1	9	–	2
Friends	5	–	4	5	–	4
Kansas Wesleyan	5	–	4	5	–	5
Southwestern (KS)	5	–	4	5	–	5
Sterling	5	–	4	5	–	5
Bethel (KS)	4	–	5	4	–	5
McPherson	4	–	5	4	–	6
Bethany (KS)	3	–	6	3	–	6
Saint Mary (KS)	3	–	6	3	–	6
Ottawa	3	–	6	3	–	7
$ – Conference champion; ^ – NAIA playoff participant; Rankings from NAIA Coaches' Poll

2005 Kansas Collegiate Athletic Conference football standings
	Conf.			Overall
Team	W		L	W		L
No. 6 Tabor $^	9	–	0	11	–	1
No. 20 Kansas Wesleyan	7	–	2	8	–	2
Friends	6	–	3	7	–	3
Sterling	5	–	4	5	–	4
McPherson	4	–	5	5	–	5
Ottawa	4	–	5	5	–	5
Saint Mary (KS)	4	–	5	5	–	5
Bethel (KS)	2	–	7	3	–	7
Southwestern (KS)	2	–	7	3	–	7
Bethany (KS)	2	–	7	2	–	8
$ – Conference champion; ^ – NAIA playoff participant; Rankings from NAIA Coaches' Poll

2006 Kansas Collegiate Athletic Conference football standings
	Conf.			Overall
Team	W		L	W		L
No. 15 Bethel (KS) +^	8	–	1	9	–	2
No. 13 Friends +^	8	–	1	9	–	2
No. 20 Kansas Wesleyan	7	–	2	8	–	2
No. 25 Sterling	7	–	2	7	–	3
Tabor	5	–	4	6	–	4
McPherson	3	–	6	3	–	7
Saint Mary (KS)	2	–	7	3	–	7
Bethany (KS)	2	–	7	2	–	8
Southwestern (KS)	2	–	7	2	–	8
Ottawa	1	–	8	1	–	9
+ – Conference co-champions; ^ – NAIA playoff participant; Rankings from NAIA Coaches' Poll

2007 Kansas Collegiate Athletic Conference football standings
	Conf.			Overall
Team	W		L	W		L
No. 17 Bethel (KS) +	8	–	1	8	–	1
No. 12 Friends +^	8	–	1	9	–	2
No. 19 Sterling	7	–	2	8	–	2
Bethany (KS)	5	–	4	6	–	4
Kansas Wesleyan	4	–	5	5	–	5
Southwestern (KS)	4	–	5	4	–	6
McPherson	3	–	6	4	–	6
Ottawa	3	–	6	4	–	6
Saint Mary (KS)	3	–	6	3	–	6
Tabor	0	–	9	1	–	9
+ – Conference co-champions; ^ – NAIA playoff participant; Rankings from NAIA Coaches' Poll

2008 Kansas Collegiate Athletic Conference football standings
	Conf.			Overall
Team	W		L	W		L
No. 9 Friends $^	9	–	0	10	–	1
No. 20 Ottawa	7	–	2	8	–	2
Sterling	7	–	2	7	–	3
Bethel (KS)	5	–	4	6	–	4
Kansas Wesleyan	5	–	4	6	–	4
Saint Mary (KS)	4	–	5	5	–	5
McPherson	3	–	6	4	–	6
Bethany (KS)	2	–	7	2	–	8
Tabor	2	–	7	2	–	8
Southwestern (KS)	1	–	8	1	–	9
$ – Conference champion; ^ – NAIA playoff participant; Rankings from NAIA Coaches' Poll

2009 Kansas Collegiate Athletic Conference football standings
	Conf.			Overall
Team	W		L	W		L
No. 6 Ottawa $^	9	–	0	11	–	1
No. 12 McPherson ^	8	–	1	9	–	2
No. 15 Friends	7	–	2	8	–	2
Sterling	5	–	4	6	–	4
Kansas Wesleyan	4	–	5	5	–	5
Bethany (KS)	3	–	6	4	–	6
Bethel (KS)	3	–	6	3	–	7
Saint Mary (KS)	3	–	6	3	–	7
Southwestern (KS)	3	–	6	3	–	7
Tabor	0	–	9	0	–	10
$ – Conference champion; ^ – NAIA playoff participant; Rankings from NAIA Coaches' Poll

2010 Kansas Collegiate Athletic Conference football standings
	Conf.			Overall
Team	W		L	W		L
No. 11 McPherson $^	9	–	0	10	–	1
No. 13 Ottawa ^	8	–	1	9	–	2
No. 22 Kansas Wesleyan	6	–	3	7	–	3
Sterling	6	–	3	7	–	3
Friends	5	–	4	6	–	4
Tabor	4	–	5	4	–	6
Bethany (KS)	3	–	6	4	–	6
Saint Mary (KS)	2	–	7	2	–	8
Southwestern (KS)	2	–	7	2	–	8
Bethel (KS)	0	–	9	0	–	10
$ – Conference champion; ^ – NAIA playoff participant; Rankings from NAIA Coaches' Poll

2011 Kansas Collegiate Athletic Conference football standings
	Conf.			Overall
Team	W		L	W		L
No. 11 Ottawa $^	9	–	0	9	–	2
Saint Mary (KS)	7	–	2	7	–	4
Bethany (KS)	6	–	3	8	–	3
Friends	5	–	4	5	–	5
Kansas Wesleyan	5	–	4	5	–	6
Southwestern (KS)	4	–	5	5	–	6
McPherson	4	–	5	4	–	7
Tabor	2	–	7	3	–	7
Bethel (KS)	2	–	7	2	–	9
Sterling	1	–	8	1	–	10
$ – Conference champion; ^ – NAIA playoff participant; Rankings from NAIA Coaches' Poll

2012 Kansas Collegiate Athletic Conference football standings
	Conf.			Overall
Team	W		L	W		L
No. 16 Ottawa $^	8	–	1	8	–	3
No. 18 Tabor	7	–	1	8	–	2
Kansas Wesleyan	6	–	3	6	–	5
Saint Mary (KS)	6	–	3	6	–	5
Friends	5	–	4	6	–	5
McPherson	4	–	4	4	–	5
Southwestern (KS)	3	–	6	4	–	7
Sterling	3	–	6	3	–	7
Bethany (KS)	2	–	7	4	–	7
Bethel (KS)	0	–	9	0	–	10
$ – Conference champion; ^ – NAIA playoff participant; Rankings from NAIA Coaches' Poll

2013 Kansas Collegiate Athletic Conference football standings
	Conf.			Overall
Team	W		L	W		L
No. 14 Sterling $^	8	–	1	9	–	3
No. 8 Tabor ^	7	–	2	10	–	3
No. 17 Friends	7	–	2	8	–	3
No. 15 Ottawa ^	7	–	2	8	–	4
McPherson	4	–	5	5	–	6
Southwestern (KS)	4	–	5	5	–	6
Kansas Wesleyan	3	–	6	4	–	7
Saint Mary (KS)	3	–	6	4	–	7
Bethany (KS)	1	–	8	2	–	9
Bethel (KS)	1	–	8	2	–	9
$ – Conference champion; ^ – NAIA playoff participant; Rankings from NAIA Coaches' Poll

2014 Kansas Collegiate Athletic Conference football standings
	Conf.			Overall
Team	W		L	W		L
No. 13 Ottawa $^	8	–	1	9	–	3
No. 21 Friends	7	–	2	8	–	3
Sterling	7	–	2	7	–	4
Bethany (KS)	5	–	4	7	–	4
No. 24 Tabor	5	–	4	7	–	4
McPherson	4	–	5	4	–	7
Saint Mary (KS)	4	–	5	4	–	7
Bethel (KS)	2	–	7	3	–	8
Kansas Wesleyan	2	–	7	2	–	9
Southwestern (KS)	1	–	8	1	–	10
$ – Conference champion; ^ – NAIA playoff participant; Rankings from NAIA Coaches' Poll

2015 Kansas Collegiate Athletic Conference football standings
	Conf.			Overall
Team	W		L	W		L
No. 8 Tabor $^	9	–	0	11	–	2
No. 14 Kansas Wesleyan ^	8	–	1	10	–	2
Sterling	7	–	2	7	–	3
Ottawa	6	–	3	6	–	4
Bethel (KS)	3	–	6	3	–	7
Bethany (KS)	3	–	6	3	–	8
Friends	3	–	6	3	–	8
Saint Mary (KS)	3	–	6	3	–	8
Southwestern (KS)	3	–	6	3	–	8
McPherson	0	–	9	0	–	10
$ – Conference champion; ^ – NAIA playoff participant; Rankings from NAIA Coaches' Poll

2016 Kansas Collegiate Athletic Conference football standings
	Conf.			Overall
Team	W		L	W		L
No. 12 Tabor $^	8	–	1	8	–	3
No. 17 Kansas Wesleyan	7	–	2	9	–	2
Saint Mary (KS)	7	–	2	8	–	3
No. 13 Sterling ^	7	–	2	8	–	3
Friends	5	–	4	6	–	5
Ottawa	4	–	5	4	–	7
Bethel (KS)	3	–	6	3	–	7
Southwestern (KS)	2	–	7	2	–	8
Bethany (KS)	1	–	8	1	–	10
McPherson	1	–	8	1	–	10
$ – Conference champion; ^ – NAIA playoff participant; Rankings from NAIA Coaches' Poll

2017 Kansas Collegiate Athletic Conference football standings
	Conf.			Overall
Team	W		L	W		L
No. 17 Tabor +	8	–	1	8	–	2
No. 16 Sterling +^	8	–	1	9	–	3
No. 21 Kansas Wesleyan	7	–	2	8	–	3
Southwestern (KS)	5	–	4	5	–	6
Bethany (KS)	4	–	5	5	–	5
Friends	4	–	5	4	–	7
Saint Mary (KS)	3	–	6	4	–	7
Ottawa	3	–	6	3	–	8
McPherson	2	–	7	3	–	7
Bethel (KS)	1	–	8	1	–	9
+ – Conference co-champions; ^ – NAIA playoff participant; Rankings from NAIA Coaches' Poll

2018 Kansas Collegiate Athletic Conference football standings
	Conf.			Overall
Team	W		L	W		L
No. 4 Kansas Wesleyan $^	10	–	0	12	–	1
No. 20 Ottawa (KS)	8	–	2	8	–	2
Avila	7	–	3	7	–	3
Tabor	6	–	4	6	–	4
Southwestern (KS)	5	–	5	6	–	5
Saint Mary (KS)	4	–	6	4	–	6
Sterling	4	–	6	4	–	6
Bethel (KS)	3	–	7	3	–	7
McPherson	3	–	7	3	–	7
Friends	3	–	7	3	–	8
Bethany (KS)	2	–	8	2	–	9
$ – Conference champion; ^ – NAIA playoff participant; Rankings from NAIA Coaches' Poll

2019 Kansas Collegiate Athletic Conference football standings
	Conf.			Overall
Team	W		L	W		L
No. 6 Kansas Wesleyan $^	10	–	0	12	–	1
No. 24 Bethel (KS)	7	–	3	8	–	3
Avila	7	–	3	7	–	3
Sterling	7	–	3	7	–	3
Tabor	5	–	5	6	–	5
McPherson	5	–	5	5	–	6
Southwestern (KS)	5	–	5	5	–	6
Bethany (KS)	4	–	6	4	–	6
Friends	3	–	7	3	–	7
Ottawa (KS)	2	–	8	2	–	8
Saint Mary (KS)	0	–	10	0	–	11
$ – Conference champion; ^ – NAIA playoff participant; Rankings from NAIA Coaches' Poll
