= David Hibbard =

David Hibbard is the name of:

- David Hibbard (stage actor) (born 1965), American stage performer
- David Sutherland Hibbard (1868–1966), American missionary and educator
