= Wayne J. McConnell =

American football coach (1912–1981)

Biographical details
- Born: April 9, 1912; Auburn, Kansas, U.S.
- Died: July 3, 1981 (aged 69); Hays, Kansas, U.S.

Coaching career (HC unless noted)

Football
- c. 1940: Atchison County Community HS (KS)
- 1947–1948: Downs HS (KS)
- 1949: Manhattan HS (KS)
- 1950–1955: College of Emporia
- 1956–1968: Fort Hays State

Basketball
- 1947–1949: Downs HS (KS)

Administrative career (AD unless noted)
- 1950–?: College of Emporia

Head coaching record
- Overall: 84–80–4 (college football)
- Bowls: 0–1

Accomplishments and honors

Championships
- Football; 4 KCAC (1951, 1953–1955); 1 CIAC (1966)

Wayne J. McConnell (April 9, 1912 – July 3, 1981) was an American football coach. He served as the head football coach at the College of Emporia in Emporia, Kansas from 1950 to 1955 and Fort Hays State University in Hays, Kansas from 1956 to 1968, and compiling a career college football coaching record of 83–80–4.

== Coaching career ==
=== College of Emporia ===
McConnell was named the head football coach at the College of Emporia in Emporia, Kansas before the start of the 1950 season and held that post through the completion of the 1955 season. His College of Emporia Fighting Presbies football teams posted a record of 39–13–1 in six seasons. They were champions of the Kansas Collegiate Athletic Conference (KCAC) four times and made an appearance in the Mineral Water Bowl in 1954.

=== Fort Hays State ===
McConnell was the head football coach at Fort Hays State University in Hays, Kansas for 13 seasons, from 1956 to 1968. His Fort Hays State Tigers football team had a record of 45–67–3.

== Head coaching record ==
=== College football ===
Year	Team	Overall	Conference	Standing	Bowl/playoffs
College of Emporia Fighting Presbies (Kansas Collegiate Athletic Conference) (1950–1955)
1950	College of Emporia	2–7	2–4	T–5th	
1951	College of Emporia	8–0	6–0	1st	
1952	College of Emporia	3–5–1	2–3–1	T–4th	
1953	College of Emporia	8–0	7–0	1st	
1954	College of Emporia	9–1	7–0	1st	L Mineral Water
1955	College of Emporia	9–0	7–0	1st	
College of Emporia:		39–13–1	31–7–1		
Fort Hays State Tigers (Central Intercollegiate Conference) (1956–1968)
1956	Fort Hays State	1–8	0–5	6th	
1957	Fort Hays State	4–4	2–2	3rd	
1958	Fort Hays State	4–4–1	2–2–1	T–3rd	
1959	Fort Hays State	3–6	1–4	T–5th	
1960	Fort Hays State	2–7	1–4	T–5th	
1961	Fort Hays State	4–4–1	3–2	3rd	
1962	Fort Hays State	6–2–1	3–1–1	2nd	
1963	Fort Hays State	2–6–1	1–3	4th	
1964	Fort Hays State	5–4	2–2	T–2nd	
1965	Fort Hays State	6–3	3–1	2nd	
1966	Fort Hays State	7–2	3–1	T–1st	
1967	Fort Hays State	3–5	2–2	3rd	
1968	Fort Hays State	2–7	0–4	5th	
Fort Hays State:		45–67–3	20–36–2		
Total:		84–80–4			
National championship Conference title Conference division title or championship game berth
