= Vernon Louis Parrington =

American literary historian (1871–1929)

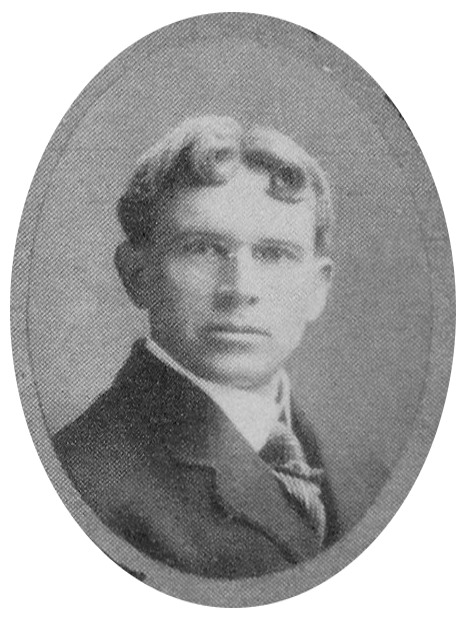
- Parrington, c. 1909
- Born: August 3, 1871; Aurora, Illinois, U.S.
- Died: June 16, 1929 (aged 57); Winchcombe, Gloucestershire, England
- Spouse: Julia Rochester Williams (married 1901)
- Writing career
- Subjects: American politics; American studies
- Coaching career

Coaching career (HC unless noted)
- 1893–1896: College of Emporia
- 1897–1900: Oklahoma

Administrative career (AD unless noted)
- 1897–1908: Oklahoma

Head coaching record
- Overall: 18–8–2

Vernon Louis Parrington (August 3, 1871 – June 16, 1929) was an American literary historian, scholar, and college football coach. The first two volumes of his is three-volume history of American letters, Main Currents in American Thought, won the Pulitzer Prize for History in 1928 and was one of the most influential books for American historians of its time. The third volume approximately half completed was completed by his associates and students after his sudden death in 1929. Parrington taught at the College of Emporia, the University of Oklahoma, and the University of Washington. He was also the head football coach at the College of Emporia from 1893 to 1896 and Oklahoma from 1897 to 1900. Parrington founded the American studies movement in 1927.

== Early life and education ==
Born in Aurora, Illinois, to a Republican family that soon moved to Emporia, Kansas, Parrington attended the College of Emporia and Harvard University, receiving his B.A. from the latter institution in 1893. He did not undertake graduate study. He was appalled by the hardships of Kansas farmers in the 1890s, and began moving left. He began his career teaching English and coaching football at the College of Emporia, which awarded him a master's degree in 1895 "for work completed 'in course.'"

== Career ==
Parrington moved to the University of Oklahoma in 1897, where he taught British literature, organized the department of English, coached the football team, played on the baseball team, edited the campus newspaper, and tried to beautify the campus. He published little and in 1908 he was fired due to pressures from religious groups who wanted all "immoral faculty" fired. Oklahomans who remember him say: "Parrington? Oh yes, He was the man in English for a number of yeaars at the University of Oklahoma. The one who left in about 1908 after he was condemened for smoking cigarets in Public." From there he went on to a distinguished academic career at the University of Washington.

Parrington was the second head coach of Oklahoma Sooners football team and first University of Oklahoma faculty member to hold the position. He is credited with bringing a Harvard style of play and better organization to the football program. During his four-year stretch from 1897 to 1900, Parrington's teams played only 12 games, compiling a record of 9–2–1. Parrington's span as head football coach was the longest of any of Oklahoma's first five coaches.

Parrington moved to the University of Washington in Seattle, Washington in 1908. He recalled in 1918, "With every passing year my radicalism draws fresh nourishment from large knowledge of the evils of private capitalism. Hatred of that selfish system is become the chief passion of my life. The change from Oklahoma to Washington marks the shift with me from the older cultural interpretation of life to the later economic."

=== Founder of American Studies ===
Parrington founded the interdisciplinary American studies movement with his 1927 work Main Currents in American Thought, a three-volume history of American letters from colonial times. The movement was expanded in the 1920s and 1930s by Perry Miller, F. O. Matthiessen, and Robert Spiller. The elements that these pioneers considered revolutionary were Parrington's interdisciplinarity, consideration of cultural analysis, and a focus on the uniqueness of North America.

From the introduction to Main Currents of American Thought:

"I have undertaken to give some account of the genesis and development in American letters of certain germinal ideas that have come to be reckoned traditionally American—how they came into being here, how they were opposed, and what influence they have exerted in determining the form and scope of our characteristic ideals and institutions. In pursuing such a task, I have chosen to follow the broad path of our political, economic, and social development, rather than the narrower belletristic."

=== Main Currents in American Thought ===
The book won the 1928 Pulitzer Prize for History. Parrington defined the three phases of U.S. history as Calvinistic pessimism, romantic optimism, and mechanistic pessimism, with democratic idealism as the main driving force.

Parrington defended the doctrine of state sovereignty, and sought to disassociate it from the cause of slavery, claiming that the association of those two causes had proven "disastrous to American democracy," removing the last brake on the growth of corporate power in the Gilded Age as the federal government began shielding capitalists from local and state regulation.

For two decades Main Currents in American Thought was one of the most influential books for American historians. Reising (1989) shows the book dominated literary and cultural criticism from 1927 through the early 1950s. Crowe (1977) calls it "the "Summa Theologica of Progressive history." Progressive history was a set of related assumptions and attitudes, which inspired the first great flowering of professional American scholarship in history. These historians saw economic and geographical forces as primary, and saw ideas as merely instruments. They regarded many dominant concepts and interpretations as masks for deeper realities.

His progressive interpretation of American history was highly influential in the 1920s and 1930s and helped define modern liberalism in the United States. After receiving overwhelming praise and exerting enormous influence among intellectuals in the 1930s and 1940s, Parrington's ideas fell out of fashion before 1950. Richard Hofstadter says "the most striking thing about the reputation of V L Parrington, as we think of it today, is its abrupt decline....during the 1940s Parrington rather quickly ceased to have a compelling interest for students of American literature, and in time historians too began to desert him." Hofstadter shows how Parrington's ideas came under heavy assault in the 1940s and 1950s, naming Lionel Trilling as especially influential in the attack. Harold Bloom says: "Parrington was, in turn, condemned to obscurity by critics like Lionel Trilling, who sharply criticized his literary nationalism and his insistence that literature should appeal to a popular constituency." Liberal historian Arthur Schlesinger, Jr., in his autobiography, says that the progressive histories of the 1920s such as Main Currents, "are little read and their authors largely forgotten." He adds that, "Main Currents impoverished the rich and complex American past. Parrington reduced Jonathan Edwards, Poe, Hawthorne, Melville, Henry James to marginal figures, practitioners of belles lettres, not illuminators of the American experience."

== Death and legacy ==
Parrington died suddenly, on June 16, 1929, in Winchcombe, England.

Hall finds that in the 1940s and 1950s English professors dropped Parrington's approach in favor of the "New Criticism" and focused on the texts themselves rather than the social, economic, and political contexts that intrigued Parrington. Meanwhile, historians shifted to a consensus model of the past that considered Parrington's dialectical polarity between liberal and conservative to be naive. During the 1950s the book lost its popularity, and was largely ignored by scholars. While dismissing its thesis, some commentators were still captivated by Parrington's politically committed writing style, as historian David W. Levy noted:

Readers and scholars of the rising generation may not follow Parrington's particular judgments or point of view, but it is hard to believe that they will not still be attracted, captivated, and inspired by his sparkle, his breadth, his daring, the ardor of his political commitment.

The Parrington Oval at the University of Oklahoma and Parrington Hall at the University of Washington are named for Parrington.

== Head coaching record ==
Year	Team	Overall	Bowl/playoffs
College of Emporia Fighting Presbies (Independent) (1893–1896)
1893	College of Emporia	0–1	
1894	College of Emporia	4–1	
1895	College of Emporia	3–2	
1896	College of Emporia	2–2	
College of Emporia:		9–6–1	
Oklahoma Sooners (Independent) (1897–1900)
1897	Oklahoma	2–0	
1898	Oklahoma	2–0	
1899	Oklahoma	2–1	
1900	Oklahoma	3–1–1	
Oklahoma:		9–2–1	
Total:		18–8–2	

== Books ==
- The Connecticut Wits (1926)
- Main Currents in American Thought (1927)
- Sinclair Lewis, Our Own Diogenes (1927)

== Sources ==
- Crowe, Charles (1966). "The Emergence of Progressive History". Journal of the History of Ideas. 27 (1): 109–124. doi:10.2307/2708311. JSTOR 2708311.
- Hall, Lark (1981). "V. L. Parrington's Oklahoma Years, 1897-1908: 'Few High Lights and Much Monotone'". Pacific Northwest Quarterly. 72 (1): 20–28. ISSN 0030-8803.
- Hall, H. Lark (1994). V. L. Parrington: Through the Avenue of Art. The standard scholarly biography
- Hofstadter, Richard (1968). The Progressive Historians: Turner, Beard, Parrington.
- Hofstadter, Richard (1941). "Parrington and the Jeffersonian Tradition". Journal of the History of Ideas. 2 (4): 391–400. doi:10.2307/2707018. JSTOR 2707018.
- Houghton, Donald E. (1970). "Vernon Louis Parrington's Unacknowledged Debt to Moses Coit Tyler". New England Quarterly. 43 (1): 124–130. doi:10.2307/363700. JSTOR 363700.
- Levy, David W. (1995). "'I Become More Radical With Every Year': The Intellectual Odyssey of Vernon Louis Parrington". Reviews in American History. 23 (4): 663–668. doi:10.1353/rah.1997.0106. S2CID 144929342.
- Reinitz, Richard (1977). "Vernon Louis Parrington as Historical Ironist". Pacific Northwest Quarterly. 68 (3): 113–119. ISSN 0030-8803.
- Reising, Russell J. (1989). "Reconstructing Parrington". American Quarterly. 41 (1): 155–164. doi:10.2307/2713202. JSTOR 2713202.
- Skotheim, Robert A.; Vanderbilt, Kermit (1962). "Vernon Louis Parrington". Pacific Northwest Quarterly. 53 (3): 100–113. ISSN 0030-8803. Summary of his ideas
- Verheul, Jaap (1999). "The Ideological Origins of American Studies". European Contributions to American Studies. 40: 91–103. ISSN 1387-9332.
