= Gwinn Henry =

American football player and track athlete (1887–1955)

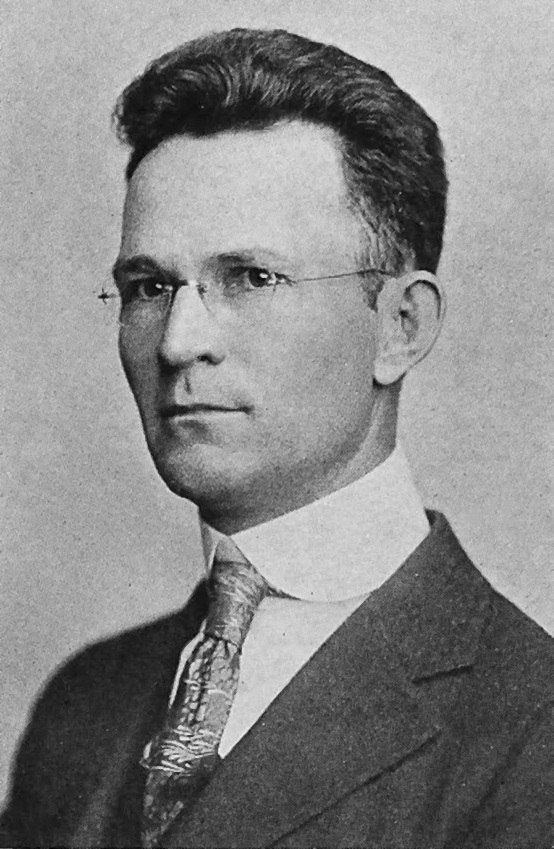

Biographical details
- Born: August 5, 1887; Eden, Texas, U.S.
- Died: May 16, 1955 (aged 67); Albuquerque, New Mexico, U.S.

Playing career

Football
- 1908: Southwestern (TX)
- Position: End

Coaching career (HC unless noted)

Football
- 1912–1914: Howard Payne
- 1918–1922: Emporia
- 1923–1931: Missouri
- 1933: St. Louis Gunners
- 1934–1936: New Mexico
- 1939–1942: Kansas

Basketball
- 1913–1914: Howard Payne

Track and field
- 1927–1929: Missouri

Administrative career (AD unless noted)
- 1938–1942: Kansas

Head coaching record
- Overall: 100–78–16 (college football); 11–2–3 (pro football); 6–3 (college basketball)
- Bowls: 0–1

Accomplishments and honors

Championships
- Football; 2 KCAC (1918–1919); 3 MVIAA (1924–1925, 1927)

Gwinn Henry (August 5, 1887 – May 16, 1955) was an American football player, track athlete, coach, and college athletics administrator. He served as the head football coach at Howard Payne University, the College of Emporia, the University of Missouri, the University of New Mexico, and the University of Kansas, compiling a career college football record of 100–78–16. Henry was also the head coach of the St. Louis Gunners, an independent professional football team, in 1933.

== Coaching career ==
=== Howard Payne ===
Henry was the first head football coach at the Howard Payne University in Brownwood, Texas, and he held that position for two seasons, from 1912 until 1913. His coaching record at Howard Payne was 5–7–3.

=== Missouri ===
Henry, circa 1926

Henry was head coach of the University of Missouri from 1923 to 1931. During his tenure, he compiled a 40–28–9 (.578) record. On December 25, 1924, he led Missouri against USC at the Los Angeles Christmas Festival, losing by a score of 20–7.

=== Other schools ===
Henry also coached at the University of Kansas, University of New Mexico, and the College of Emporia.

== Late life and death ==
Henry moved to Albuquerque, New Mexico, in 1943 and entered the real estate business. He died there on May 16, 1955, at the age of 67.

== Family ==
Henry is the grandfather of collegiate track and field coach Pat Henry.

== Head coaching record ==
=== College football ===
Year	Team	Overall	Conference	Standing	Bowl/playoffs
Howard Payne Yellow Jackets (Independent) (1912–1913)
1912	Howard Payne	2–3–1			
1913	Howard Payne	3–4–2			
Howard Payne:		5–7–3			
College of Emporia Fighting Presbies (Kansas Collegiate Athletic Conference) (1918–1922)
1918	College of Emporia	6–0		1st	
1919	College of Emporia	8–0	8–0	1st	
1920	College of Emporia	6–1–1	6–1–1	3rd	
1921	College of Emporia	4–2–1	4–1	4th	
1922	College of Emporia	6–1–2	5–1–2	3rd	
College of Emporia:		30–4–4			
Missouri Tigers (Missouri Valley Intercollegiate Athletic Association) (1923–1931)
1923	Missouri	2–3–3	1–3–2	T–7th	
1924	Missouri	7–2	5–1	1st	L Los Angeles Christmas Festival
1925	Missouri	6–1–1	5–1	1st	
1926	Missouri	5–1–2	4–1	3rd	
1927	Missouri	7–2	5–1	1st	
1928	Missouri	4–4	3–2	T–2nd	
1929	Missouri	5–2–1	3–1–1	2nd	
1930	Missouri	2–5–2	1–2–2	5th	
1931	Missouri	2–8	1–4	T–5th	
Missouri:		40–28–9	28–16–5		
New Mexico Lobos (Border Conference) (1934–1936)
1934	New Mexico	8–1	3–1	2nd	
1935	New Mexico	6–4	3–2	3rd	
1936	New Mexico	2–7	1–4	7th	
New Mexico:		16–12	7–7		
Kansas Jayhawks (Missouri Valley Intercollegiate Athletic Association) (1939–1942)
1939	Kansas	2–6	1–4	T–4th	
1940	Kansas	2–7	0–5	6th	
1941	Kansas	3–6	2–3	4th	
1942	Kansas	2–8	1–4	T–5th	
Kansas:		9–27	4–16		
Total:		100–78–16			
National championship Conference title Conference division title or championship game berth
