= Henry Brock =

Playing career

Football
- 1927–1930: Pittsburg State

Coaching career (HC unless noted)

Football
- 1941: College of Emporia
- 1942: Southwestern (KS)

Basketball
- 1945–1946: Southwestern (KS)

Head coaching record
- Overall: 5–11–2

Henry Brock was an American college football player and coach. He played at Pittsburg State University in Pittsburg, Kansas from 1927 to 1930. Then went on to coach in the beginning of the 1940s.

== Coaching career ==
=== College of Emporia ===
Brock was head football coach at the College of Emporia in Emporia, Kansas for the 1941 season.

=== Southwestern ===
After one season at College of Emporia, Brock became the 10th football coach at the Southwestern College in Winfield, Kansas, serving one season, in 1942 season, and compiling a record of 4–3–2.

Brock was also the basketball coach at Southwestern for the 1945–46 season, producing a record of 11–9.

== Head coaching record ==
=== Football ===
Year	Team	Overall	Conference	Standing	Bowl/playoffs
College of Emporia Fighting Presbies (Kansas Collegiate Athletic Conference) (1941)
1941	College of Emporia	1–8	1–5	T–5th	
College of Emporia:		1–8	1–5		
Southwestern Moundbuilders (Central Intercollegiate Conference) (1942)
1942	Southwestern	4–3–2	2–2–1	T–3rd	
Southwestern:		4–3–2	2–2–1		
Total:		5–11–2			
