= Lester Selves =

American football player and coach (1906–1991)

Biographical details
- Born: July 16, 1906; Saffordville, Kansas, U.S.
- Died: April 18, 1991 (aged 84); Olathe, Kansas, U.S.

Playing career
- 1927–1930: College of Emporia
- Position: Halfback

Coaching career (HC unless noted)
- 1936: McPherson
- 1937–1939: College of Emporia

Head coaching record
- Overall: 13–18–4 (college football)

Lester Henry "Bud" Selves (July 16, 1906 – April 18, 1991) was an American football player and coach. He was inducted into the Kansas State High School Activities Association Hall of Fame in 1978.

== Playing career ==
Selves played offense and defense for the College of Emporia Fighting Presbies in Emporia, Kansas, playing on the undefeated 1928 team coached by L. T. Harr. Selves was selected All-Conference and was also a member of the track team.

== Coaching career ==
=== McPherson ===
Selves was the head football coach at McPherson College in McPherson, Kansas. He held that position for the 1936 season. His coaching record at McPherson was 5–3–1.

=== Olathe ===
In 1947, Selves was hired as an assistant football coach and head track coach at Olathe High School in Olathe, Kansas. He also coached sports and taught mathematics at the junior high school in Olathe until his retirement in 1971.

== Death ==
Selves died on April 18, 1991, at the Olathe Medical Center.

== Head coaching record ==
=== College football ===
| Year | Team | Overall | Conference | Standing | Bowl/playoffs |
|---|---|---|---|---|---|
McPherson Bulldogs (Kansas Collegiate Athletic Conference) (1936)
| 1936 | McPherson | 5–3–1 | 3–1–1 | T–2nd | |
| McPherson: | | 5–3–1 | 3–1–1 | | |
College of Emporia Fighting Presbies (Kansas Collegiate Athletic Conference) (1937–1939)
| 1937 | College of Emporia | 2–6 | 1–3 | 5th | |
| 1938 | College of Emporia | 4–4–1 | 3–2 | T–2nd | |
| 1939 | College of Emporia | 2–5–2 | 2–3–1 | 5th | |
| College of Emporia: | | 8–15–3 | 6–8–1 | | |
| Total: | | 13–18–4 | | | |
