= Tom Stromgren =

American football player and coach (born 1936)

Biographical details
- Born: 1936 (age 89–90); Osage City, Kansas, U.S.

Playing career
- c. 1957: College of Emporia

Coaching career (HC unless noted)
- 1964: Emporia HS (KS)
- 1965–1966: College of Emporia
- 1969–1971: Fort Hays State

Head coaching record
- Overall: 18–25–2 (college)

Accomplishments and honors

Championships
- 1 KCAC (1966)

Lawrence Thompson Stromgren (born 1936) is an American former football coach. He served as the head football coach at the College of Emporia in Emporia, Kansas from 1965 to 1966 and Fort Hays State University in Hays, Kansas, from 1969 to 1971, and compiling a career college football coaching record of 18–25–2. Stromgren was born in 1936 in Osage City, Kansas.

== Head coaching record ==
=== College ===
Year	Team	Overall	Conference	Standing
College of Emporia Fighting Presbies (Kansas Collegiate Athletic Conference) (1965–1966)
1965	College of Emporia	5–3–1	5–3–1	T–4th
1966	College of Emporia	8–1	8–1	T–1st
College of Emporia:		13–4–1	13–4–1	
Fort Hays State Tigers (Rocky Mountain Athletic Conference) (1969–1971)
1969	Fort Hays State	0–9	0–6	7th (Plains)
1970	Fort Hays State	5–5	2–3	4th (Plains)
1971	Fort Hays State	2–7–1	1–3–1	T–4th (Plains)
Fort Hays State:		7–21–1	3–12–1	
Total:		18–25–2		
National championship Conference title Conference division title or championship game berth
