= Lem Harkey =

American football player (1934–2004)

No. 32
- Position: Fullback

Personal information
- Born: January 7, 1934; Oklahoma City, Oklahoma, U.S.
- Died: July 3, 2004 (aged 70); San Antonio, Texas, U.S.
- Listed height: 6 ft 1 in (1.85 m)
- Listed weight: 205 lb (93 kg)

Career information
- College: College of Emporia
- NFL draft: 1955: 6th round, 66th overall pick

Career history
- San Francisco 49ers (1955)

Career NFL statistics
- Rushing yards: 27
- Rushing average: 4.5
- Stats at Pro Football Reference

Lem Harkey Jr. (January 7, 1934 – July 3, 2004) was an American professional football fullback. He played for San Francisco 49ers in 1955. He played college football for the College of Emporia Fighting Presbies in Emporia, Kansas.

In college, Harkey was all-conference and all-American at College of Emporia as a fullback and averaged 8.2 yards per carry through all his college years. In 1953, his senior year, he led the nation with 168 yards per game.
