= Jim Jaquith =

American football player (1898–1960)

Profile
- Positions: Quarterback, placekicker

Personal information
- Born: April 11, 1898; Council Grove, Kansas, U.S.
- Died: July 5, 1960 (aged 62); Shasta County, California, U.S.
- Listed height: 5 ft 9 in (1.75 m)
- Listed weight: 175 lb (79 kg)

Career information
- College: College of Emporia

Career history
- Kansas City Cowboys (1926); Rock Island Independents (1926)

Career statistics
- Games played: 1
- Stats at Pro Football Reference

James Mark Jaquith, sometimes spelled Jacquith (April 11, 1898 – July 5, 1960) was an American football player who played at the back and placekicker positions.

Jaquith was born on April 11, 1898, in Council Grove, Kansas. He served in the United States Army during World War I, enlisting on May 7, 1917, and receiving his discharge on April 29, 1919. He attended Emporia College where he played quarterback for the football team. He led the 1921 Emporia team to the Kansas Conference championship and was selected as the quarterback on the all-Kansas football team. He was also a placekicker.

After leaving Emporia, Jaquith was an assistant coach for the University of Missouri in 1923. He played football in 1925 with George Wilson's Pacific Coast team. In September 1926, he signed with the Rock Island Independents of the American Professional Football League (AFL). He was released by Rock Island in early October 1926. He also played one game during the 1926 season for the Kansas City Cowboys of the National Football League (NFL). He was one of two "Fighting Presbies" to ever make it to the NFL.

At the time of the 1930 and 1940 U.S. Censuses, Jaquith was living in Fresno, California. In 1930, he was employed as an attendant at a gas plant. In 1940, he was a supervisor in government work. At the outbreak of World War II, he lived in Fresno and was employed by the State of California in the surplus commodities program. Jaquith died on July 5, 1960, in Shasta County, California, at the age of 62.
