= Helen Marshall (historian) =

American historian of nursing

Helen Edith Marshall
- Born: October 25, 1898; Braman, Oklahoma
- Died: August 1988 (aged 89); Green Valley, Arizona
- Resting place: Sahuarita, Arizona
- Education: College of Emporia (A.B.); University of Chicago (M.A.); Duke University (Ph.D)
- Occupation: Historian

Helen Marshall (October 25, 1898 – August 1988) was an American historian of nursing.

== Life and work ==
Helen Edith Marshall was born in Braman, Oklahoma, on 25 October 1898. Throughout her life, she lived in the following places: Oklahoma; Kansas; North Dakota; New Mexico; Illinois; Montreal, Quebec, Canada; Manchester, England; and Arizona. She had one brother, Leon Soutierre Marshall, that was born in Oklahoma in 1904. Marshall was awarded her A.B. degree from the College of Emporia in 1923, her M.A. from the University of Chicago in 1929, and her Ph.D. from Duke University in 1934. In between her studies, she taught school from 1916 to 1931. Marshall was appointed an instructor in history at the University of New Mexico in 1930, and then she became professor of history and chair of the social science department at Eastern New Mexico College, in Portales, New Mexico, from 1934 to 35. She later became an instructor in American history at Illinois State University in Normal, Illinois, where she remained until she retired in 1967 as a full professor. Marshall published Dorothea Dix: Forgotten Samaritan, a Book-of-the-Month Club alternate in 1937. Almost twenty years later Illinois State University Press published Grandest of Enterprises and then The Eleventh Decade in 1967. Five years later Marshall wrote Mary Adelaid Nutting: Pioneer in Modern Nursing with a U.S. Public Health Grant. In addition to her books, she contributed articles to the Journal of the Illinois Historical Society and the New Mexico Quarterly.

She died in August 1988 in Green Valley, Arizona, and she is buried in Sahuarita, Arizona.

== The Grandest of Enterprises ==
Marshall's monograph, The Grandest of Enterprises, provides a detailed history of Illinois State University from 1857-1957. Since it was published in 1956, it has received criticism for its deliberate omissions and falsehoods. The book is accused by other historians as having a literary flair that dilutes the truth and failing to provide proper sources for the information provided. It is hypothesized that her goal was to present the university in the most favorable way possible, thus she ignored any details that contradicted that goal.
