= David Sutherland Hibbard =

American missionary and educator

David S. Hibbard
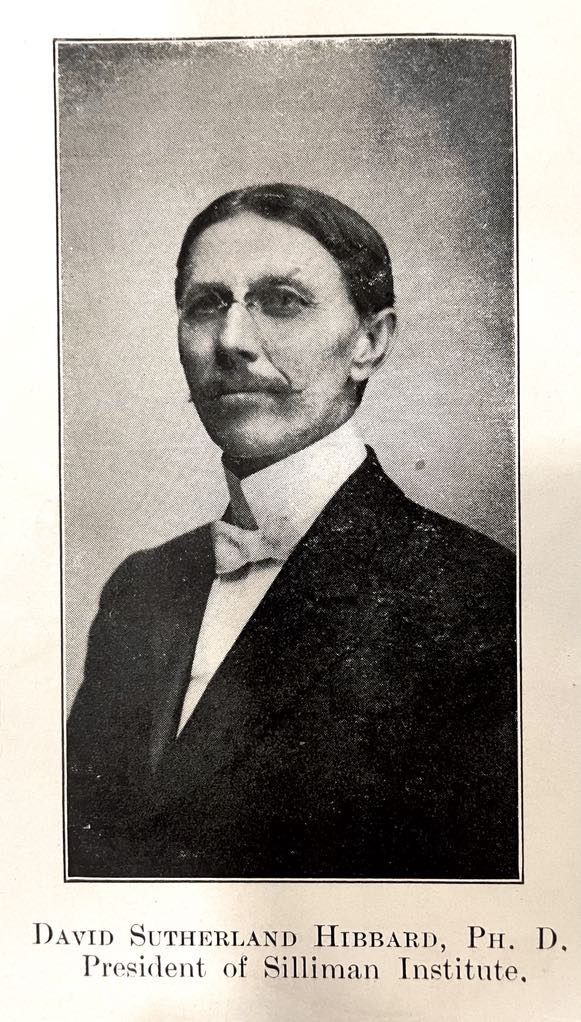
- Dr. David Sutherland Hibbard's official portrait found in Silliman Institute's 1914 yearbook

1st President of Silliman University
- In office 1901–1930
- Preceded by: Position created
- Succeeded by: Roy H. Brown

Personal details
- Born: October 31, 1868 Hamden, Ohio
- Died: December 30, 1966 (aged 98) Los Angeles, California
- Spouse: Laura Hibbard
- Education: Princeton University; Princeton Theological Seminary; College of Emporia
- Profession: Missionary, educator

David Sutherland Hibbard (October 31, 1868 – December 30, 1966) was an American missionary and educator who established and served as first president of Silliman Institute, now Silliman University in Dumaguete, Philippines.

== Biography ==
=== Education ===
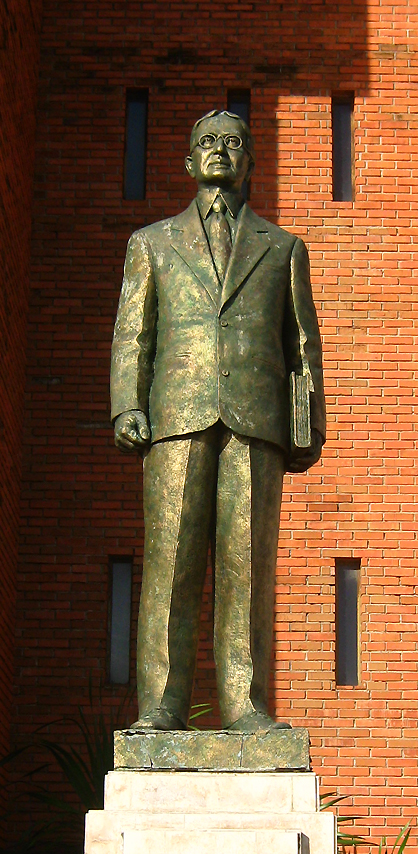
Dr. David S. Hibbard's statue facing Rizal Boulevard in Dumaguete

Prior to his assignment in the Philippines by the Presbyterian Board of Foreign Missions, Hibbard obtained his undergraduate degree from Emporia College in Emporia, Kansas. Thereafter, he received Theological Training at the Princeton Theological Seminary and went to obtain his Master of Arts Degree in Philosophy from Princeton University.

=== Missionary work ===
After graduating from Princeton in 1896, Hibbard served as a pastor at a local church in Lyndon, Kansas for three years. In February 1899, he accepted an invitation from the Presbyterian Board of Foreign Missions to serve in the Philippines, which at that time recently fell under the ambit of the United States following Spain's defeat in the Spanish–American War. At about the same time a certain Dr. Horace Silliman appeared at the office of the Presbyterian Board of Foreign Missions in New York City to contribute a sum of money to what he envisioned would be an industrial school for boys in the Philippines. Dr. Silliman has been a long and active supporter of schools and colleges. Among such institutions was Hampton Institute of Virginia, and his proposal to the Presbyterian Board was for an industrial school in the Philippines on the Hampton model. Persuaded by Dr. Silliman's persistence, the Board decided to establish the school.

Arriving in the Philippines in 1899, Hibbard was instructed to scout the southern part of the Philippine Islands to determine the best location for the school. His original points of destination were Cebu, Zamboanga and Iloilo. While in Cebu, a suggestion came to him to make a side-trip to Dumaguete. On his arrival in the locality, he was met by a Rev. Captain John Anthony Randolph, chaplain of the 6th U.S. Infantry Regiment stationed at that time in Dumaguete, who later on introduced him to Don Meliton Larena, the town's local presidente and to his brother Demetrio Larena, then the vice-governor of the province. Hibbard got attracted to the place and decided to establish the school in the locality. He would later on write that the "beauty of Dumaguete and the friendliness of the people" helped in bringing about his decision.

=== Silliman Institute ===
On August 28, 1901, David Hibbard together with his wife Laura officially opened classes for the newly established Silliman Institute in a rented house in Dumaguete. About half a century later, Hibbard would recall that:

"There were fifteen boys that first morning. The equipment consisted of four desks about ten feet long, two tables and two chairs, a few McGuffey’s Readers, a few geographies, arithmetics and ninth-grade grammars. I was President; Mrs. Hibbard was the faculty."

=== Presidency ===
During his incumbency as president which spanned roughly thirty years (1901–1930), Hibbard saw the growth of Silliman Institute from being an elementary school for boys to that of a liberal arts college in 1910. Under his leadership, the Institute rose to prominence becoming one of the nation's foremost higher education institutions. In a Board of Educational Survey Report in 1925 created by the Philippine Legislature, a positive assessment was made of the school. The report stated to wit:

"The most influential Protestant institution of higher learning is Silliman Institute at Dumaguete on Negros Island. In location, acreage, buildings, equipment and sanitary arrangements, this institution is a most attractive contrast to the private universities described above. A library of 8,000 volumes administered by a trained librarian has been wisely selected. Its finest building is devoted to the teaching of the sciences. The recitations heard by the Commission's representative were most ably conducted and the spirit that pervaded the place was one of the finest he experienced anywhere. Moreover, the Commission heard only words of praise throughout the Islands for graduates of Silliman Institute, particularly of those who entered the public schools as teachers."

=== Recognition ===
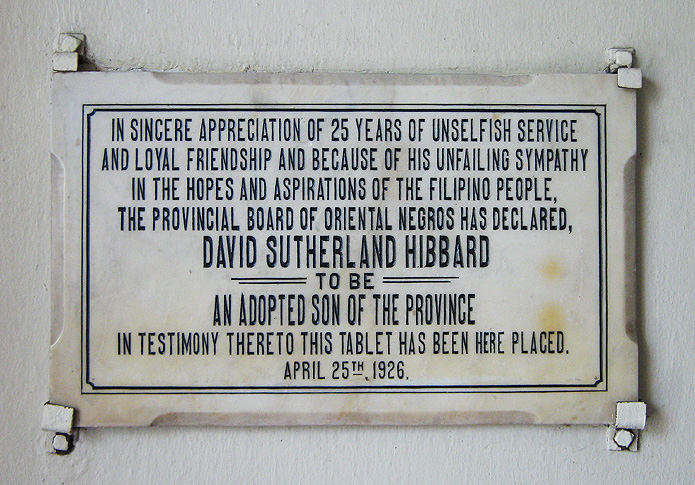
Stone tablet at the lobby of Hibbard Hall showing the Provincial Board's declaration.

Due to his contribution and commitment to education, the Provincial Board of the Province of Oriental Negros passed a resolution in 1926 declaring him as an "Adopted Son of the Province". The resolution was "In sincere appreciation of [his] 25 years of unselfish service and loyal friendship…his unfailing sympathy in the hopes and aspirations of the Filipino people." Prior to such recognition, the then municipality of Dumaguete also recognized Hibbard by renaming the northern end of Alfonso XIII Street Hibbard Avenue.

In March 1937, the University of the Philippines conferred upon Hibbard the degree of Doctor of Laws, Honoris Causa. Later, on the 50th anniversary of the Philippine public schools system, Hibbard also received a medal and a diploma of merit "for a long, untiring, and distinguished service to private education, as president emeritus of Silliman, and for being the oldest living former private school head."

On March 10, 1994, the College Assurance Plan (CAP) recognized Hibbard's contributions to education with a statue in front of its building "to inspire the people of today as he did the people of his generation ‘to pursue excellence in the best of their intellectual, moral, and spiritual values’". In 1996, CAP also started an Annual Hibbard's Symposium on Education which is held every August coinciding with the Founders Day celebration of Silliman University.
