= 1954 Hastings Broncos football team =

American college football season

1954 Hastings Broncos football

NCC champion

Mineral Water Bowl, W 20–14 vs. College of Emporia
- Conference: Nebraska College Conference
- Record: 9–0 (7–0 NCC)
- Head coach: Tom McLaughlin (6th season)
- Home stadium: A. H. Jones Stadium

1954 Nebraska College Conference football standings
	Conf.					Overall
Team	W		L		T	W		L		T
Hastings $	7	–	0	–	0	9	–	0	–	0
Peru State	5	–	2	–	0	7	–	2	–	0
Kearney State	4	–	2	–	1	5	–	3	–	1
Midland	3	–	4	–	0	4	–	4	–	0
Wayne State (NE)	3	–	4	–	0	5	–	4	–	0
Doane	2	–	5	–	0	2	–	7	–	0
Nebraska Wesleyan	2	–	4	–	1	3	–	6	–	1
Chadron State	1	–	6	–	0	1	–	7	–	0
$ – Conference champion; Doane forfeited a conference win over Midland.

The 1954 Hastings Broncos football team was an American football team that represented Hastings College as a member of the Nebraska College Conference (NCC) during the 1954 college football season. In their sixth season under head coach Tom McLaughlin, the Broncos compiled a perfect 9–0 record (7–0 in conference games), won the NCC championship, defeated College of Emporia in the Mineral Water Bowl, and outscored opponents by a total of 230 to 97.

Five Hastings players were selected as first-team players on the 1954 NCC all-conference team: Lavon Eisenhauer at end; Veryl Borden at guard; Gene Fleharty at tackle; Chuck Stickels at quarterback; and Bruce Edwards at halfback. Two others were named to the second team: Hilly Beck at the end and Ladd Cochrane at the back. Guard Jim Sterp received an honorable mention.

The team played home games at A. H. Jones Stadium in Hastings, Nebraska.

== Schedule ==
Date	Opponent	Site	Result	Attendance	Source
September 18	Colorado State–Greeley*	A. H. Jones Stadium; Hastings, NE	W 26–19		
September 24	Kearney State		W 21–14		
October 2	Doane	A. H. Jones Stadium; Hastings, NE	W 33–12		
October 9	at Wayne State (NE)	Memorial Field; Wayne, NE	W 19–7		
October 16	Midland	A. H. Jones Stadium; Hastings, NE	W 40–0		
October 23	Peru State^{†}	A. H. Jones Stadium; Hastings, NE	W 15–13	3,800	
October 29	at Nebraska Wesleyan	Lincoln, NE	W 21–6		
November 6	at Chadron State	Chadron, NE	W 35–12		
November 25	vs. College of Emporia*	Excelsior Springs, MO	W 20–14		
*Non-conference game; ^{†}Homecoming

== Roster ==
- Hilly Beck, end, junior, 6', 185 pounds, Minden
- Veryl Borden, guard, junior, 6'2", 210 pounds, Hastings
- Ladd Cochrane, back, junior, 6'1", 180 pounds, Oshkosh
- Bruce Edwards, back, sophomore, 5'10-1/2", 160 pounds, Pawnee City (set NCC scoring record)
- Lavon Eisenhauer, end, junior, 6', 176 pounds, Naponee
- Gene Fleherty, tackle, 6'2", 195 pounds, Hastings
- Tom Garrett, halfback, freshman
- Rex Steinkruger, back, senior
- Jim Sterup, guard, junior
- Chuck Stickels, quarterback, senior, 6'1", 170 pounds, Hastings (strong passer and ball handler, led the team's split-T)
- Gaylen Taylor, center, junior
- Virgil Taylor, tackle, frosh
- Larry Van Boening, tackle, freshman
