= Harold Grant =

American football coach (1900–1997)

Biographical details
- Born: January 16, 1900; Emporia, Kansas, U.S.
- Died: December 31, 1997 (aged 97); Ventura, California, U.S.

Playing career
- 1918–1922: College of Emporia

Coaching career (HC unless noted)
- 1923–1927: College of Emporia
- 1928–1936: Missouri Mines

Head coaching record
- Overall: 62–39–6

Accomplishments and honors

Championships
- 2 KCAC (1925, 1927)

Harold S. Grant (January 16, 1900 – December 31, 1997) was an American football coach. He was the fifth head football coach at the College of Emporia in Emporia, Kansas. His teams accumulated a record of 34–4–1. His teams won the Kansas Collegiate Athletic Conference championship in 1925 and shared the title in 1927 with cross-town rival Kansas State Teachers.

Grant later resided in Redondo Beach, California.

== Head coaching record ==
Year	Team	Overall	Conference	Standing
College of Emporia Fighting Presbies (Kansas Collegiate Athletic Conference) (1923–1927)
1923	College of Emporia	5–3	5–3	7th
1924	College of Emporia	6–1	6–1	2nd
1925	College of Emporia	7–0	7–0	T–1st
1926	College of Emporia	7–1	6–1	T–2nd
1927	College of Emporia	7–0–1	6–0–1	T–1st
College of Emporia:		32–5–1	30–5–1	
Missouri Mines Miners (Missouri College Athletic Union) (1928–1932)
1928	Missouri Mines	3–4–1	1–1–1	4th
1929	Missouri Mines	5–3	1–2	T–5th
1930	Missouri Mines	5–1–1	3–0	2nd
1931	Missouri Mines	5–3	2–0	2nd
1932	Missouri Mines	4–3–1	1–0	2nd
Missouri Mines Miners (Independent) (1933–1934)
1933	Missouri Mines	4–3		
1934	Missouri Mines	2–6		
Missouri Mines Miners (Missouri Intercollegiate Athletic Association) (1935–1936)
1935	Missouri Mines	1–7	0–5	6th
1936	Missouri Mines	1–4–2	0–3–2	5th
Missouri Mines:		30–34–5	8–11–3	
Total:		62–39–6		
National championship Conference title Conference division title or championship game berth
