= Saint Mary's Academy and College =

Private school in St. Marys, Kansas, United States

- Motto: Instaurare Omnia in Christo (To Restore All Things in Christ)
- Type: Religious School, Society of St. Pius X
- Established: 1978; 48 years ago
- Rector: Patrick Rutledge
- Location: St. Marys, Kansas, U.S. 39°11′31″N 96°03′33″W
- Campus: Suburban
- Colors: Blue and White
- Mascot: Crusaders
- Website: smac.edu

Saint Mary's Academy and College is a religious school of the Society of St. Pius X located in St. Marys, Kansas.

== The original St. Mary's College ==
The original college at this location, St. Mary's College, was founded by the Jesuits in 1848 as an Indian mission. The school is the site of the first cathedral west of the Missouri River and east of the Rockies, the 1851 "log cathedral" of Bishop John Baptist Miège, S.J., Apostolic Vicar of Kansas under Pope Pius IX known familiarly as "The Bishop East of the Rockies".

When the Potawatomi were forcibly removed, the Jesuits turned it into a boarding school for boys, until it closed during the Great Depression. After 1931 the 465 acre (1.9 km²) plot hosted the divinity school of St. Louis University. With the movement of seminaries to the city after Vatican II, the land was sold and the Jesuit divinity school returned to St. Louis in 1967.

=== Athletics ===
The St. Mary's athletic teams were called the Knights. The college was a member of the National Association of Intercollegiate Athletics (NAIA), primarily competing in the Kansas Collegiate Athletic Conference (KCAC) from 1902–03 to 1930–31, the season where the school closed.

=== Notable people ===
Alumni

- Robert Casey (1890–1962), combat veteran, newspaper correspondent and columnist for Chicago Daily News
- Charles Comiskey (1859–1931), baseball player, manager, team owner. He was the founding owner of the Chicago White Sox. Comiskey Park was named for him.

Faculty

- Ernest Quigley (1880–1960), basketball referee, umpire in Major League Baseball, football coach at Kansas Wesleyan University. At St. Mary's College, he was coach, teacher, athletic director from 1903 to 1912.

== Saint Mary's Academy and College ==
In 1978, the Society of Saint Pius X acquired the property along with 12 major buildings. The school is now incorporated in Kansas as The Society of Saint Pius X of Saint Mary's, Inc. It has no ties with the previous St. Mary's College.

=== Athletics ===
The Academy teams play in the Kansas Christian League in football and soccer and against some non-league teams.

==== Controversy ====
In February 2008, St. Mary's Academy made news when a female referee was told that she could not officiate at the high school basketball game. The other referee allegedly claimed that someone told him it was because she "could not be put in a position of authority over boys because of the academy's beliefs". The Academy denied this belief. St. Mary's Academy was removed from the Kansas State High School Activities Association list of approved schools. They were reinstated two years later.

St. Mary's official reply to the incident was in a press release:

This alleged reason was neither stated nor is it held by any official of St. Mary's Academy, as evidenced by the fact that the faculty and staff of St. Mary's includes many honorable ladies of talent and erudition....
St. Mary's Academy follows the directives of the Catholic Church regarding co-education. The Church has always promoted the ideal of forming and educating boys and girls separately during the adolescent years, especially in physical education (Cf. Divini Illius Magistri - Encyclical on the Christian Education of Youth, by Pope Pius XI, 1929 and The Instruction of the Sacred Congregation of Religious on Co-Education, A.A.S., 25 (1958) pp. 99-103). This formation of adolescent boys is best accomplished by male role models, as the formation of girls is best accomplished by women. Hence in boys' athletic competitions, it is important that the various role models (coaches and referees) be men.

In 2004, the school forfeited a football game against White City High School because the opponent had a girl on the team.

=== St. Mary's Priory ===
St. Mary's Academy and College is also a traditional Catholic congregation of approximately 4,300 persons (2023).

In 2019, St. Mary's Academy and College announced plans for the construction of a new Immaculata Church, expected to hold 1500 people and to be the largest SSPX church in Kansas.

On May 3, 2023, the Immaculata Church was consecrated by Bishop Bernard Fellay.
