= College of Emporia Fighting Presbies football =

College football team of the College of Emporia

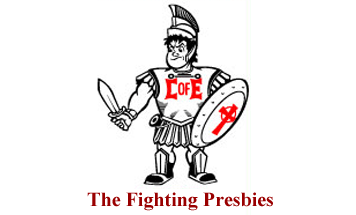
- First season: 1893
- Last season: 1973
- Stadium: Schaffner Field
- Location: Emporia, Kansas
- Bowl record: 1–1 (.500)

Conference championships
- 14
- Colors: Red and White

The College of Emporia football team was a college football team at the College of Emporia in Emporia, Kansas. The team competed from 1893 until the college closed in 1974 and was known for its high quality play for the size of the school as well as its early adoption of modern football methods.

The final coach of the program was Dan Taylor.

== Innovative play ==
The team was one of the earliest schools to regularly call the forward pass and the option pass under head coach Bill Hargiss and quarterback Arthur Schabinger. The school was using the forward pass as a regular play three years before Knute Rockne and Notre Dame Football.

The program would regularly play games against much larger programs. In 1921, the Presbies played Oklahoma A&M to a 7–7 tie. The College of Emporia managed an all-time record of 22–20–2 ties against cross-town rival Emporia State—although Emporia State records the all-time record between the two teams as 21–21–2.

The 1930 Thanksgiving Day game against Emporia State (called "Kansas Normal" at the time) resulted in tragedy when freshman George Day suffered a head injury during a punt return five minutes into the game. He was treated quickly and taken to Newman Hospital for surgery, but he died that evening.

== Conference play and season successes ==
=== Kansas Collegiate Athletic Conference ===
The team competed in the Kansas Collegiate Athletic Conference from 1933 until 1970. The program was known for success among the small colleges which included three consecutive undefeated regular seasons (1953–1955) under head coach Wayne J. McConnell and two back-to-back undefeated seasons (1962–1963) under coach Bill Schnebel. Both coaches were recognized as Little All-American Coach of the Year.

=== Conference championships ===
Year	Conference	Head coach	Overall record	Conference record	Postseason
1913	Kansas Collegiate Athletic Conference	Wayne B. Granger	5–2–1	5–0–1	
1918	Kansas Collegiate Athletic Conference	Gwinn Henry	6–0		
1919	Kansas Collegiate Athletic Conference	Gwinn Henry	8–0	8–0	
1925	Kansas Collegiate Athletic Conference	Harold Grant	7–0	7–0	
1927	Kansas Collegiate Athletic Conference	Harold Grant	7–0–1	6–0–1	
1928	Central Intercollegiate Conference	L. T. Harr	8–0	6–0	
1951	Kansas Collegiate Athletic Conference	Wayne J. McConnell	8–0	6–0	
1953	Kansas Collegiate Athletic Conference	Wayne J. McConnell	8–0	7–0	
1954	Kansas Collegiate Athletic Conference	Wayne J. McConnell	8–1	7–0	Lost Mineral Water Bowl
1955	Kansas Collegiate Athletic Conference	Wayne J. McConnell	7–0	7–0	
1959	Kansas Collegiate Athletic Conference	Bill Schnebel	9–1	7–0	Won Mineral Water Bowl
1962	Kansas Collegiate Athletic Conference	Bill Schnebel	10–1	9–0	Lost NAIA Semifinal
1963	Kansas Collegiate Athletic Conference	Bill Schnebel	10–1	9–0	Lost NAIA Semifinal
1966	Kansas Collegiate Athletic Conference	Tom Stromgren	8–1	8–1	

== Bowl games ==
The College of Emporia also in the 1954 Mineral Water Bowl, losing, 20–14, to Hastings, and then returned in 1959 to defeat Austin by a score of 21–20.

Date	Result	Bowl	Opponent	Score	Head coach
November 25, 1954	L	Mineral Water Bowl	Hastings	14–20	Wayne J. McConnell
November 28, 1959	W	Mineral Water Bowl	Austin	21-20	Bill Schnebel

== NAIA playoffs ==
The Fighting Presbies made two appearances in the NAIA playoffs. Their combined record was 0–2 and they would lose to the eventual national champion both times.

Year	Round	Opponent	Result
1962	Semifinal	vs. Central State (OK)	L 0–20
1963	Semifinal	at Saint John's (MN)	L 0–54

== Notable people ==
Coaches

Football coaches - Horace Botsford, Henry Brock, Harold Grant, Homer Hargiss, Lem Harkey, Gwinn Henry, Steve Kazor, Wayne McConnell, Walt Newland, Vernon Louis Parrington, Bill Schnebel, Lester Selves, Tom Stromgren, Dick Banister

Players

A number of player from the College of Emporia went on to play in sports:

- Jim Jaquith played professional baseball in 1926 and also played for the Kansas City Cowboys.
- Lem Harkey was drafted by the Pittsburgh Steelers in 1955 and ended up playing for the San Francisco 49ers for one year.
- Bill Danenhauer (graduated 1956) NAIA Football All-American. Baltimore Colts, Denver Broncos and Boston Patriots

== See also ==
- Timeline of college football in Kansas
