= Friends Falcons =

- University: Friends University
- Nickname: Falcons
- Association: NAIA
- Conference: KCAC (primary)
- Athletic director: Dr. Rob Ramseyer
- Location: Wichita, Kansas
- Varsity teams: 23
- Football stadium: Adair-Austin Stadium
- Basketball arena: Garvey Center
- Softball stadium: Two Rivers Youth Complex (Note: Not owned by Friends University but property of the state of Kansas.)
- Soccer stadium: Adair-Austin Stadium
- Tennis venue: Forrest Lattner Courts
- Outdoor track and field venue: Adair-Austin Stadium
- Volleyball arena: Garvey Center
- Colors: Scarlet and gray
- Mascot: Freddy Falcon
- Website: friendsathletics.com
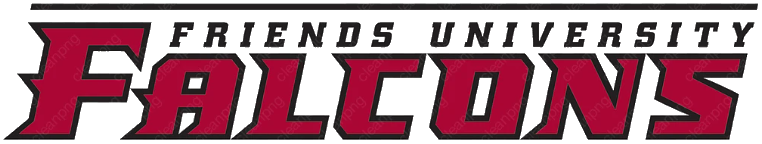

The Friends Falcons are the athletic teams that represent Friends University, located in Wichita, Kansas, in intercollegiate athletics as a member of the National Association of Intercollegiate Athletics (NAIA), primarily competing in the Kansas Collegiate Athletic Conference (KCAC) since the 1953–54 academic year; which they were a member on a previous stint from 1902–03 to December 1928 (of the 1928–29 school year).

== Varsity teams ==
Friends competes in 19 intercollegiate varsity sports:

Men's sports	Women's sports
Basketball	Basketball
Cross country	Cross country
Football	Golf
Golf	Powerlifting
Powerlifting	Soccer
Soccer	Softball
Tennis	Tennis
Track and field^{1}	Track and field^{1}
Wrestling	Volleyball
	Wrestling
^{1} – includes both indoor and outdoor

=== Football ===
Friends University is coached by Terry Harrison, who has held the position since the 2023 season. Under Harrison's leadership, the Falcons have become well known for a highly aggressive, run-centric flexbone offense. In the 2025 season, the Falcons were first in rushing yards, with an average of 459.9 yards per game, but were 93rd out of 94 in passing yards, with an average of 52.8 yards per game, second only to the Mayville State Comets. The Falcons also led the league in points, with an average of 54.2 points per game.

==== Bowl games ====
In 1972, Friends was defeated by the Ottawa Braves in the Mineral Water Bowl by a score of 27–20.

== Facilities ==
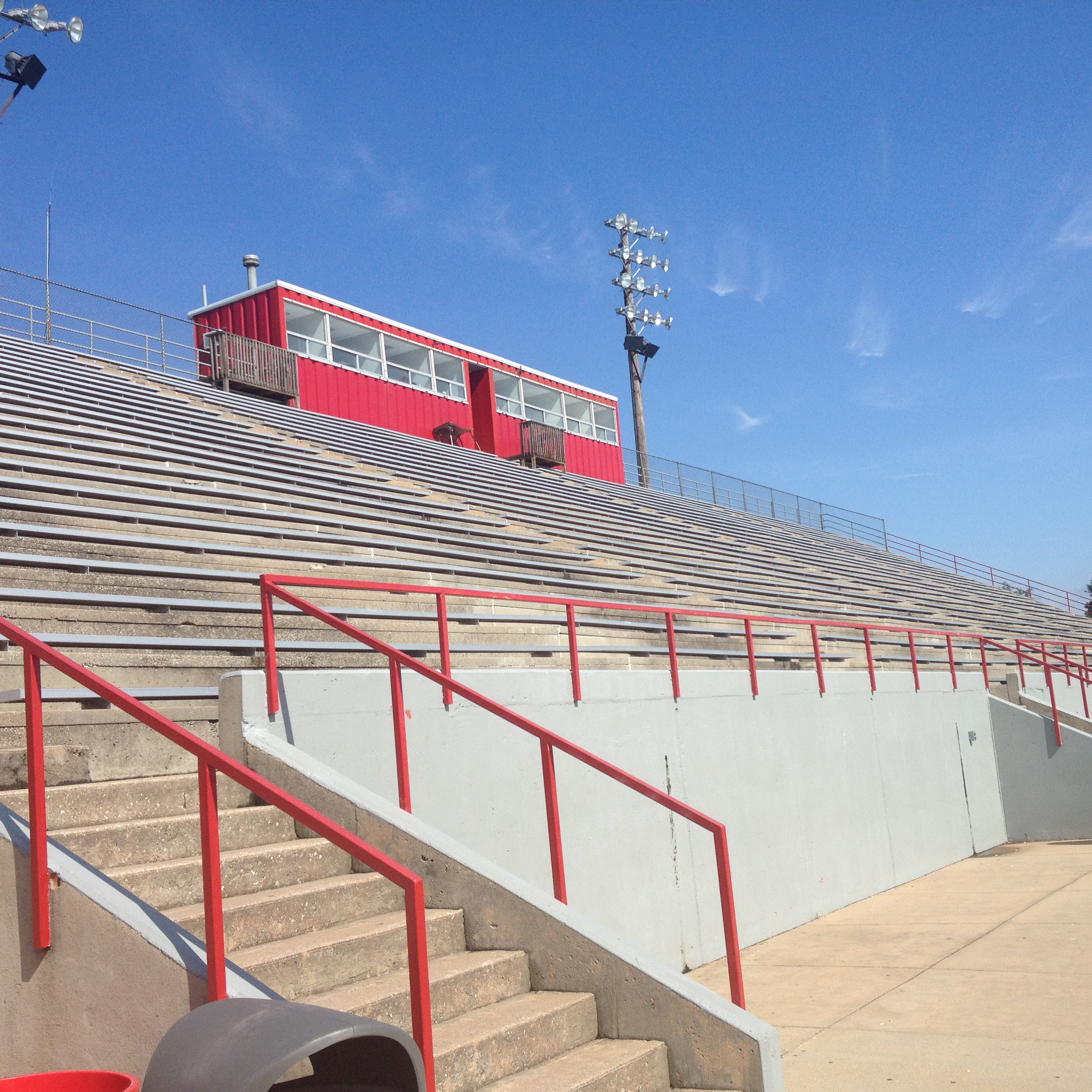
Stand of the Adair-Austin Stadium

Venue	Sport(s)	Ref.
Adair-Austin Stadium	Football; Soccer; Track and field	
Garvey Center	Basketball; Volleyball	
Forrest Lattner Courts	Tennis	
Crestview Country Club (Note: Private golf club.)	Golf	

== Mascot ==
The school's first athletic teams were known as the "Fighting Quakers" which symbolized the schools affiliation with the Society of Friends. In the 1930s, governance of the institution was turned over to an independent board not affiliated with the religious organization that founded the school. Still, the university's athletic teams remained known as the Fighting Quakers and used a duck as their mascot symbol up to 1960.

After 1960, student body began to desire a different mascot to represent Friends University. "Freddy Falcon" was created as a response to this initiative and adopted by the school.
