= College of Emporia =

Private college in Emporia, Kansas, US

- Motto: Via Veritas Vita (Latin)
- Motto in English: The Way and the Truth and the Life
- Type: Private
- Active: 1882–1974
- Religious affiliation: Presbyterian Church
- Location: Emporia, Kansas
- Colors: Red and White
- Nickname: Fighting Presbies
- Sporting affiliations: NAIA – HAAC (until 1974)
- Mascot: Fighting Presbies

The College of Emporia was a private college in Emporia, Kansas, United States. It operated from 1882 to 1974 and was associated with the Presbyterian church.

When founded, it was one of two higher education institutions in the city of Emporia; the other was the "Kansas State Normal School", established for teacher training, later renamed Kansas State Teachers College (KSTC), and reorganized in the 1970s as Emporia State University. Since Emporia had two colleges before 1900, the city was sometimes called the "Athens of Kansas."

== History ==
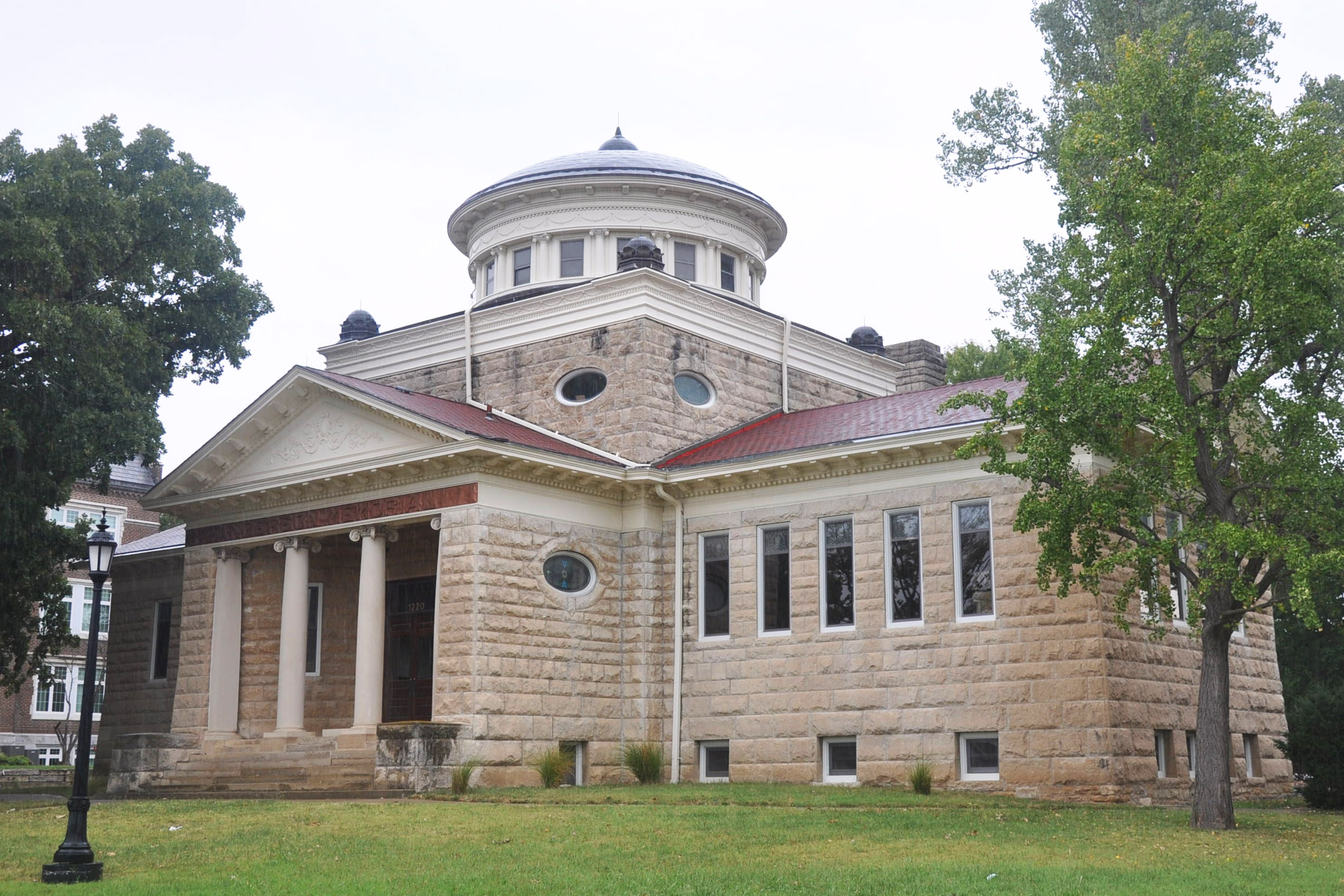
Anderson Carnegie Memorial Library, Emporia, Kansas, southeast view as seen in 2021

The College of Emporia was founded in 1882. In March 1909, the "Lewis Academy", a Presbyterian school in Wichita, consolidated with the College of Emporia.

Colonel John Byers Anderson of Manhattan, Kansas, donated his personal library to the college in 1888, and he served as president of the board of trustees of the college. Twelve years later, a Carnegie grant provided the funds for the college to build the Anderson Memorial Library, in memory of John B. Anderson, whom Carnegie had known when younger and who later served on the board of trustees of the College of Emporia. The library was placed on the National Register of Historic Places on June 25, 1987.

The Registrar's office at Emporia State University is the official custodian of the transcripts for the former College of Emporia.

The college campus was purchased by The Way International for $694,000 and was operated as The Way College of Emporia from 1975 until 1989.

== Athletics ==
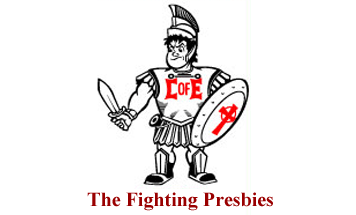
Presbie Pete, the mascot for the College of Emporia

The College of Emporia (CoE) athletic teams were called the Fighting Presbies. The college was a member of the National Association of Intercollegiate Athletics (NAIA), primarily competing in the Heart of America Athletic Conference (HAAC) from 1971–1972 to 1973–1974. The Fighting Presbies previously competed in the Kansas Collegiate Athletic Conference (KCAC) from 1933–1934 to 1970–1971, which they were a member on a previous stint from 1902–1903 to 1922–1923; as well as in the Central Intercollegiate Athletic Conference (CIC) from 1923–1924 to 1932–1933.

=== Football ===
Football was established in the late 1890s and existed until the college closed its doors in 1974. The team known as the red and white "Fighting Presbies" had a proud tradition—over 70 years of football the college won 14 conference football championships, including an undefeated, untied, and unscored on season in 1928.

In 1955, alumnus Lem Harkey was drafted in the sixth round by the Pittsburgh Steelers. The college's most famous player and honored coach was Homer Woodson Hargiss.

== Notable alumni ==
Faculty

- Football coaches – Horace Botsford, Henry Brock, Harold Grant, Homer Hargiss, Lem Harkey, Gwinn Henry, Steve Kazor, Wayne McConnell, Walt Newland, Bill Schnebel, Lester Selves, Tom Stromgren

Alumni

- Dale Corson (1914–2012) – eighth president of Cornell University, physics professor at Cornell, author, served on National Advisory Committee for Aeronautics
- William Culbertson (1884–1966) – U.S. Ambassador to Romania and Chile, member of United States International Trade Commission, United States Army Colonel
- John Dalley (1935–) – violinist, violin bow maker, teaching at Curtis Institute of Music, artist-in-residence at the University of Illinois at Urbana-Champaign and University of Maryland
- Nelson Fuson (1913–2006) – physicist, longtime professor at Fisk University, and a Quaker civil rights activist
- Kyung-Chik Han (1902–2000) – pastor, church planter, recipient of the 1992 Templeton Prize for Progress in Religion
- Vic Hurt (1899–1978) – college coach for football / basketball / track, played football at College of Emporia
- David Hibbard (1868–1966) – missionary, educator, first president of Silliman Institute (now Silliman University) in Philippines
- Jerry Karr (1936–2019) – Kansas Senator, economics professor at University of Central Missouri, Wilmington College, Njala University
- Helen Marshall (1898–1988) – nursing historian, history professor at University of New Mexico, Eastern New Mexico University, Illinois State University
- Carroll Newsom (1904–1990) – eleventh president of New York University, president of publisher Prentice Hall, math professor
- Vernon Parrington (1871–1929) – literary historian and scholar, Pulitzer Prize winner, English professor at College of Emporia / University of Oklahoma / University of Washington, second head football coach at University of Oklahoma
- Brock Pemberton (1885–1950) – Broadway theatrical producer, founder and chairman of the Tony Awards
- Arthur Samuel (1901–1990) – computer scientist, electrical engineering professor at Massachusetts Institute of Technology, computer science professor at Stanford University
- Jack Sinagra (1950–2013) – New Jersey State Senator, chairman of the Port Authority of New York and New Jersey
- William Allen White (1868–1944) – journalist, author, Pulitzer Prize winner, newspaper owner and editor of the Emporia Gazette, founding editor of the Book of the Month Club
