= Baker Wildcats football =

Football team that represents Baker University

- First season: 1890; 136 years ago
- Athletic director: Susan Decker
- Head coach: Miguel Regalado; 3rd season, 24–9 (.727)
- Location: Baldwin City, Kansas
- Stadium: Liston Stadium
- Field: Don Parker Field
- League: NAIA
- Conference: Heart of America Athletic Conference
- Division: Heart of America South Division
- Colors: Blue and orange
- All-time record: 646–409–39 (.608)

Conference championships
- 21

The Baker Wildcats football team represents Baker University in the sport of college football. They participate in the NAIA and in the Heart of America Athletic Conference (HAAC).
