= Bethany Swedes football =

College football team

- First season: 1893; 133 years ago
- Athletic director: Laura Moreno
- Head coach: Mike Grossner; 3rd season, 7–26 (.212)
- Location: Lindsborg, Kansas
- Stadium: Lindstrom Field (capacity: 2,500)
- Conference: KCAC
- Colors: Blue and gold

Conference championships
- 19
- Website: bethanyswedes.com

The Bethany Swedes football team represents Bethany College in the sport of college football. They are part of the National Association of Intercollegiate Athletics (NAIA), competing in the Kansas Collegiate Athletic Conference (KCAC). Historically known as the "Terrible Swedes", the sport began at Bethany in 1893 when the college played two games and finished with a record of one win and one loss. The school played two games again in 1894, then did not field a team until 1901 when the program produced five wins, two losses, and one tie.

Former coach Ted Kessinger was named to the College Football Hall of Fame in 2010 and former coach Bennie Owen was inducted in 1951.
