= List of Sterling Warriors head football coaches =

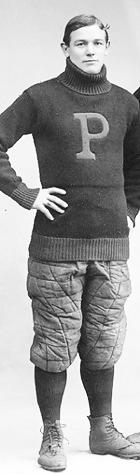
Josiah McCracken coached the team in 1903, after his appearance in the 1900 Summer Olympics.

The Sterling Warriors football program is a college football team that represents Sterling College in Sterling, Kansas as a member of the Kansas Collegiate Athletic Conference (KCAC) in National Association of Intercollegiate Athletics (NAIA) competition. Sterling has had 36 head football coaches since the school's first recorded football game in 1893. The current head coach is Reggie Langford Jr..

== Key ==
Key to symbols in coaches list
General		Overall		Conference		Postseason (Note: Although the first Rose Bowl Game was played in 1902, it has been continuously played since the 1916 game, and is recognized as the oldest bowl game by the NCAA. "—" indicates any season prior to 1916 when postseason games were not played.)	
No.	Order of coaches (Note: A running total of the number of head coaches, with coaches who served separate tenures being counted only once. Interim head coaches are represented with "Int" and are not counted in the running total. "—" indicates the team played but either without a coach or no coach is on record. "X" indicates an interim year without play.)	GC	Games coached	CW	Conference wins	PW	Postseason wins
DC	Division championships	OW	Overall wins	CL	Conference losses	PL	Postseason losses
CC	Conference championships	OL	Overall losses	CT	Conference ties	PT	Postseason ties
NC	National championships	OT	Overall ties (Note: Overtime rules in college football were introduced in 1996, making ties impossible in the period since.)	C%	Conference winning percentage		
†	Elected to the College Football Hall of Fame	O%	Overall winning percentage (Note: When computing the win–loss percentage, a tie counts as half a win and half a loss.)				

== Coaches ==
Statistics correct as of the end of the 2025 college football season.

No.	Name	Term	GC	OW	OL	OT	O%	CW	CL	CT	C%	PW	PL	CCs	NCs	Awards
—	No coach / unknown	1893–1895, 1898, 1901, 1904–1905, 1907–1909	31	11	18	2	.387	—	—	—		—	—	—	—	
1	G. W. Benn	1900	3	2	1	0	.667	—	—	—		—	—	—	—	
2	Professor Schaffner	1902	6	3	2	1	.583	—	—	—		—	—	—	—	
3	Josiah McCracken	1903	7	2	5	0	.286	—	—	—		—	—	—	—	
4	Garfield Weede	1910–1918	68	34	30	4	.529	—	—	—		—	—	—	—	
5	Fred A. Dunsmore	1919	9	0	8	1	.056	0	8	1	.056	—	—	—	—	
6	T. E. McDonald	1920	8	0	7	1	.063	0	7	1	.063	—	—	—	—	
7	E. H. Faler	1921	7	1	6	0	.143	1	6	0	.143	—	—	—	—	
8	Warren Woody	1922–1924	26	17	7	2	.692	17	7	2	.692	—	—	1	—	
9	E. R. Cowell	1925–1927	23	9	12	1	.432	9	12	1	.432	—	—	—	—	
10	Art Kahler	1928–1930	26	19	5	2	.769	3	2	1	.583	—	—	—	—	
11	Ralph Kirby	1934	8	0	8	0	.000	—	—	—		—	—	—	—	
12	Harvey Chrouser	1935–1939	44	17	21	6	.455	—	—	—		—	—	—	—	
13	Lou Odle	1940–1941	19	7	10	2	.421	—	—	—		—	—	—	—	
14	Lorin Helm	1942	8	0	8	0	.000	—	—	—		—	—	—	—	
15	John Paden	1945	3	0	3	0	.000	—	—	—		—	—	—	—	
16	Duane Wilson	1946–1948	26	5	20	1	.212	—	—	—		—	—	—	—	
17	Os Doenges	1949–1952	37	5	30	2	.162	—	—	—		—	—	—	—	
18	Clair L. Gleason	1953–1959	58	29	29	0	.500	—	—	—		—	—	—	—	
19	Benny Fose	1960	9	1	8	0	.111	1	8	0	.111	—	—	—	—	
20	Sam Wilkey	1961	9	1	8	0	.111	1	8	0	.111	—	—	—	—	
21	Robert Mistele	1962–1963	18	3	14	1	.194	3	14	1	.194	—	—	—	—	
22	Reuben Berry	1964–1965	18	4	14	0	.222	4	14	0	.222	—	—	—	—	
23	Curt Bennett	1966–1973, 1981, 1997–2000	122	59	50	3	.496	50	50	2	.500	—	—	—	—	
24	Sam Sample	1974–1976	27	10	16	1	.389	10	13	1	.438	—	—	—	—	
25	Les Unruh	1977–1980	36	10	25	1	.292	10	21	1	.328	—	—	—	—	
26	Scott Downing	1982–1983	18	13	4	1	.750	13	4	1	.750	—	—	—	—	
27	Gary D. White	1984–1987	39	25	14	0	.641	24	12	0	.667	—	—	—	—	
28	Hadley Hicks	1988–1989	19	3	16	0	.158	3	15	0	.167	—	—	—	—	
29	Kim Raynor	1990–1993	39	13	26	0	.333	12	22	0	.353	—	—	—	—	
30	Bill Bauer	1994–1996	30	7	23	0	.233	7	17	0	.292	—	—	—	—	
31	Mark Splitter	2001–2003	30	4	26	0	.133	4	23	0	.148	—	—	—	—	
32	Andy Lambert	2004–2015	123	72	51	0	.585	68	40	0	.630	0	1	1	—	
33	Chuck Lambert	2016–2017	23	17	6	0	.739	15	3	0	.833	0	1	1	—	
34	Chase Hansen	2018–2021	41	18	23	0	.439	17	20	0	.459	—	—	—	—	
35	Darren Jackson II	2022–2023	21	4	17	0	.190	3	12	0	.200	—	—	—	—	
36	Reggie Langford Jr.	2024–present	22	3	19	0	.136	2	8	0	.200	—	—	—	—	

== See also ==
- Lists of people from Kansas
