= Chuck Lambert =

American football coach

Biographical details
- Born: Smith Center, Kansas, U.S.

Playing career
- c. 1990s: Trinity International
- Position: Quarterback

Coaching career (HC unless noted)
- c. 1990s: Trinity International (assistant)
- 1999–2003: Lockwood HS (MO)
- 2004–?: Sterling (DC)
- ?–2015: Sterling (AHC/DC)
- 2016–2017: Sterling

Head coaching record
- Overall: 17–6 (college); 43–14 (high school)
- Tournaments: 0–1 (NAIA playoffs)

Accomplishments and honors

Championships
- 1 KCAC (2017)

Chuck Lambert is an American college football coach. He was the head football coach at the Sterling College in Sterling, Kansas from 2016 to 2017. He was named to that position beginning with the 2016 season after his brother and former head coach, Andy Lambert, resigned to take the head coaching position at Southern Nazarene University. Chuck played college football for Trinity International and was a graduate from Smith Center High School where he played quarterback.

Lambert was the head football coach for Lockwood High School in Lockwood, Missouri, from 1999 to 2003 and led the team to a 43–14 record.

== Head coaching record ==
=== College ===
| Year | Team | Overall | Conference | Standing | Bowl/playoffs | NAIA^{#} |
|---|---|---|---|---|---|---|
Sterling Warriors (Kansas Collegiate Athletic Conference) (2016–2017)
| 2016 | Sterling | 8–3 | 7–2 | T–2nd | | 13 |
| 2017 | Sterling | 9–3 | 8–1 | T–1st | L NAIA First Round | 16 |
| Bethany: | | 17–6 | 15–3 | | | |
| Total: | | 17–6 | | | | |
