= E. R. Cowell =

American football and basketball coach (1897–1931)

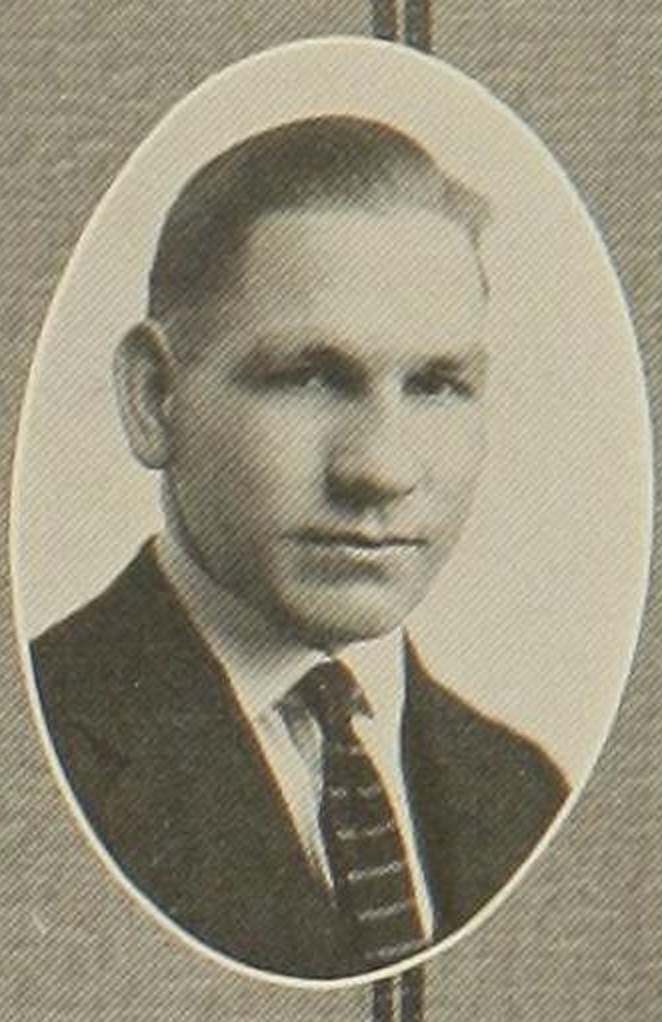
- Cowell pictured in Royal purple 1921, Kansas Agricultural yearbook

Biographical details
- Born: September 24, 1897; Clay Center, Kansas, U.S.
- Died: July 15, 1931 (aged 33); Clay Center, Kansas, U.S.

Playing career

Football
- 1919–1920: Kansas State

Basketball
- 1918–1921: Kansas State

Baseball
- 1919–1920: Kansas State
- Positions: Quarterback, halfback (football); Guard (basketball)

Coaching career (HC unless noted)

Football
- 1921–1922: Norton HS (KS)
- 1923–1924: Ottawa (assistant)
- 1925–1927: Sterling

Basketball
- 1923–1925: Ottawa

Head coaching record
- Overall: 9–12–1 (college football); 16–20 (college basketball)

Everett Russell "Shorty" Cowell (September 24, 1897 – July 15, 1931) was an American football and basketball coach. He served as the football coach at Sterling College in Sterling, Kansas, from 1925 to 1927, compiling a record of 9–12–1. Cowell was also the head basketball coach at Ottawa University in Ottawa, Kansas, from 1923 to 1925, tallying a mark of 16–20. He attended Kansas State Agricultural College—now known as Kansas State University—where lettered in football, basketball, and baseball.

== Early life and playing career ==
Cowell was born in Clay Center, Kansas, on September 24, 1897, to Jasper Cowell, originally of England, and his wife, Effie. He was an alumnus of Kansas State Agricultural College—now known as Kansas State University—from which he graduated in the field of "animal husbandry" in 1921. At Kansas State, Cowell played on the school's baseball team in the 1919 and 1920 seasons, the football team from 1917 to 1920 and also the basketball team from at least 1918, to his graduation year of 1921. He had also earned nine total letters in baseball and football. On the football field, Cowell, nicknamed "Shorty", was said to have "a combination of physique, speed and football sense", rendering him a very effective halfback. His brother, Warren (Brady) also played on the team in 1920, as a halfback. Cowell was also an accomplished varsity basketball player, having been named to the All-Missouri Valley varsity team in 1918 and 1919 seasons as a guard. He was a member of the Delta Tau Delta fraternity.

== Coaching career ==
Prior to his graduation and during his years as a player, Cowell coached a football team in his hometown of Clay Center. Upon graduation from college, Cowell coached football at Norton High School in Norton, Kansas, from 1921 to 1922. In 1923, Cowell accepted a position at Ottawa University in Ottawa, Kansas, as an assistant under coach Edwin Elbel, when it was stated that he had "one of the best football teams in the state". He remained at Ottawa early 1925, when he resigned in protest of a new university policy that would require the coach to teach at the college as well. In May 1925, he was hired as by Sterling College in Sterling, Kansas to succeed Warren Woody head football coach. In three seasons at Sterling, 1925 to 1927, he led his teams to a record of 9–12–1.

In 1927, Cowell was elected vice president of the Mid-Continent Athletic Association. He died on July 15, 1931, and was buried at Greenwood Cemetery at Clay Center.

== Head coaching record ==
=== College football ===
Year	Team	Overall	Conference	Standing	Bowl/playoffs
Sterling Warriors (Kansas Collegiate Athletic Conference) (1925–1927)
1925	Sterling	1–5–1	1–5–1	T–14th	
1926	Sterling	4–3	4–3	7th	
1927	Sterling	4–4	4–4	9th	
Sterling:		9–12–1	9–12–1		
Total:		9–12–1			
