= Les Unruh =

American football coach (born c. 1934)

Biographical details
- Born: c. 1934

Coaching career (HC unless noted)
- 1972–1975: Chaparral HS (AZ)
- 1977–1980: Sterling
- 1982–: Wichita Flyers

Head coaching record
- Overall: 10–25–1 (college)

Les Unruh (born c. 1934) is an American former football coach. He served as the head football coach at Sterling College in Sterling, Kansas for four seasons, from 1977 to 1980, compiling a record of 10–25–1.

== Head coaching record ==
Year	Team	Overall	Conference	Standing	Bowl/playoffs
Sterling Warriors (Kansas Collegiate Athletic Conference) (1977–1980)
1977	Sterling	3–6	3–5	T–5th	
1978	Sterling	3–6	3–5	T–6th	
1979	Sterling	2–7	2–6	T–7th	
1980	Sterling	2–6–1	2–5–1	7th	
Sterling:		10–25–1	10–21–1		
Total:		10–25–1			
