= Sam Wilkey =

American football coach (born 1938)

Biographical details
- Born: 1938 (age 87–88)
- Education: Sterling (KS)

Coaching career (HC unless noted)
- 1961: Sterling

Head coaching record
- Overall: 1–8

Samuel Lee Wilkey (born 1938) is an American former football coach. He served as the head football coach at Sterling College in Sterling, Kansas for one season, in 1961, compiling a record of 1–8. Wilkey is a 1960 graduate of Sterling College in Sterling, Kansas, where he holds three letters in athletics.

== Head coaching record ==
Year	Team	Overall	Conference	Standing	Bowl/playoffs
Sterling Warriors (Kansas Collegiate Athletic Conference) (1961)
1961	Sterling	1–8	1–8	9th	
Sterling:		1–8	1–8		
Total:		1–8			
