= Curt Bennett (American football) =

American football player and coach (1935–2011)

Biographical details
- Born: December 16, 1935; Sterling, Kansas, U.S.
- Died: January 26, 2011 (aged 75); Hutchinson, Kansas, U.S.

Playing career
- c. 1953–1954: Hutchinson
- 1956–1957: Sterling
- Position: Halfback

Coaching career (HC unless noted)
- 1966–1973: Sterling
- 1981: Sterling
- 1997–2000: Sterling

Head coaching record
- Overall: 59–60–3

Curtis Eugene Bennett (December 16, 1935 – January 26, 2011) was an American football coach. He served as the head football coach at Sterling College in Sterling, Kansas for 13 seasons over three stints, compiling a record of 59–60–3 His first tenure was from 1966 until the end of the 1973 season. He coached again for one year in 1981 and finally from 1997 until 2000.

Bennett graduated from Sterling High School in 1953. He attended Hutchinson Junior College—now known as Hutchinson Community College—in Hutchinson, Kansas, where he played football as a halfback for two season. Bennett transferred to Sterling College and set an National Association of Intercollegiate Athletics (NAIA) record in 1956 with 2,166 total yards of offense.

Bennett died on January 26, 2011.

== Head coaching record ==
Year	Team	Overall	Conference	Standing	Bowl/playoffs
Sterling Warriors (Kansas Collegiate Athletic Conference) (1966–1973)
1966	Sterling	2–7	2–7	T–8th	
1967	Sterling	3–5–1	3–5–1	7th	
1968	Sterling	3–6	3–6	T–7th	
1969	Sterling	5–5	3–2	T–2nd (South)	
1970	Sterling	4–4–1	2–3	4th (South)	
1971	Sterling	7–2	6–2	3rd	
1972	Sterling	5–3–1	5–2–1	2nd	
1973	Sterling	6–3	5–3	T–3rd	
Sterling Warriors (Kansas Collegiate Athletic Conference) (1980)
1981	Sterling	5–4	5–3	T–3rd	
Sterling Warriors (Kansas Collegiate Athletic Conference) (1997–2000)
1997	Sterling	3–7	2–6	T–7th	
1998	Sterling	4–6	3–5	7th	
1999	Sterling	5–5	4–4	T–5th	
2000	Sterling	4–6	4–5	6th	
Sterling:		59–60–3	50–50–2		
Total:		59–60–3			
