= John Paden =

American football coach and educator (1902–1993)

Biographical details
- Born: April 13, 1902; Olvey Township, Boone County, Arkansas, U.S.
- Died: July 21, 1993 (aged 91); Hutchinson, Kansas, U.S.

Coaching career (HC unless noted)
- 1945: Sterling

Head coaching record
- Overall: 0–3

John William Paden (April 13, 1902 – July 21, 1993) was an American football coach and educator. He served as the head football coach at Sterling College in Sterling, Kansas for one season, in 1945, compiling a record of 0–3.

Paden was born on April 13, 1902, in Olvey Township, Boone County, Arkansas. He worked as a teacher, coach, and administrator for 41 at schools in Esbon, Holyrood, and Lucas, Kansas. Paden lived in Radium, Kansas for 25 years. He died on July 21, 1993, at Hutchinson Hospital in Hutchinson, Kansas.

== Head coaching record ==
Year	Team	Overall	Conference	Standing	Bowl/playoffs
Sterling Warriors (Independent) (1945)
1945	Sterling	0–3			
Sterling:		0–3			
Total:		0–3			
