= E. H. Faler =

American football coach

E.H. Faler
Biographical details
- Born: July 3, 1893; Colony, Kansas, U.S.
- Died: February 27, 1960 (aged 66); Sterling, Kansas, U.S.
- Education: Emporia State University

Coaching career (HC unless noted)
- 1921: Sterling

Head coaching record
- Overall: 1–6

Edgar Henry Faler (July 3, 1893 – February 27, 1960) was an American football coach. He served as the head football coach at Sterling College in Sterling, Kansas for one season, in 1921, compiling a record of 1–6.

== Head coaching record ==
Year	Team	Overall	Conference	Standing	Bowl/playoffs
Sterling Warriors (Kansas Collegiate Athletic Conference) (1921)
1921	Sterling	1–6	1–6	14th	
Sterling:		1–6	1–6		
Total:		1–6			
