= Benny Fose =

American football coach

Biographical details
- Born: March 20, 1921; Russell, Kansas, U.S.
- Died: June 19, 1993 (aged 72); Pueblo, Colorado, U.S.

Coaching career (HC unless noted)
- 1960: Sterling

Head coaching record
- Overall: 1–8

Benhardt Frederick Fose (March 20, 1921 – June 19, 1993) was an American football coach. He served as the head football coach at Sterling College in Sterling, Kansas for one season, in 1960, compiling a record of 1–8. Fose was a veteran of World War II. He died at his residence in Pueblo, Colorado in 1993.

== Head coaching record ==
Year	Team	Overall	Conference	Standing	Bowl/playoffs
Sterling Warriors (Kansas Collegiate Athletic Conference) (1960)
1960	Sterling	1–8	1–8	10th	
Sterling:		1–8	1–8		
Total:		1–8			
