= Mark Splitter =

American football coach

Coaching career (HC unless noted)
- 2001–2003: Sterling

Head coaching record
- Overall: 4–26

Mark Splitter is an American football coach. He served as the head football coach at Sterling College in Sterling, Kansas for three seasons, from 2001 to 2003, compiling a record 4–26.

== Head coaching record ==
Year	Team	Overall	Conference	Standing	Bowl/playoffs
Sterling Warriors (Kansas Collegiate Athletic Conference) (2001–2003)
2001	Sterling	4–6	4–5	T–6th	
2002	Sterling	0–10	0–9	10th	
2003	Sterling	0–10	0–9	10th	
Sterling:		4–26	4–23		
Total:		4–26			
