= G. W. Benn =

American football coach

Coaching career (HC unless noted)
- 1900: Cooper

Head coaching record
- Overall: 2–1

G. W. Benn was an American football coach. He served as the head football coach at Cooper Memorial College—now known as Sterling College—in Sterling, Kansas for one season, in 1900, compiling a record of 2–1.
