= Hadley Hicks =

American sports coach and author (1933–2016)

Biographical details
- Born: January 1, 1933; Bisbee, Arizona, U.S.
- Died: June 21, 2016 (aged 83)

Playing career

Baseball
- 1957–1958: Arizona State
- 1958: Pulaski Cubs
- Position: Outfielder

Coaching career (HC unless noted)

Football
- 1988–1989: Sterling

Head coaching record
- Overall: 3–16

Hadley Fergus Hicks (April 1, 1933 – June 21, 2016) was an American football and baseball coach and author. He served as the head football coach at Sterling College in Sterling, Kansas for two seasons, from 1988 to 1989, compiling a record of 3–16.

Before coaching in college, Hicks was prominent in Arizona athletics and served on the board of the Arizona Athletic Hall of Fame. He also later wrote stories about his work in high school and college athletics. Hicks also played baseball at Arizona State University and later for one year in the minor leagues with the Pulaski Cubs.

== Head coaching record ==
Year	Team	Overall	Conference	Standing	Bowl/playoffs
Sterling Warriors (Kansas Collegiate Athletic Conference) (1988–1989)
1988	Sterling	1–9	1–8	T–9th	
1989	Sterling	2–7	2–7	T–8th	
Sterling:		3–16	3–15		
Total:		3–16			
