= Clair L. Gleason =

American sports coach and college athletics administrator

Biographical details
- Born: May 17, 1923; Burr Oak, Kansas, U.S.
- Died: June 29, 1986 (aged 63); Hutchinson, Kansas, U.S.

Coaching career (HC unless noted)

Football
- 1953–1959: Sterling

Basketball
- ?: Sterling

Administrative career (AD unless noted)
- 1953–1986: Sterling

Head coaching record
- Overall: 29–29 (football); 104–120

Clair LaVane Gleason (May 17, 1923 – June 29, 1986) was an American football, basketball, and baseball and track coach and college athletic administrator. He served as the head football coach at Sterling College in Sterling, Kansas, for seven seasons, from 1953 to 1959, compiling a record of 29–29. Gleason succeeded Os Doenges as athletic director and coach at Sterling in 1953. He was previously the director of physical education at Miltonvale Wesleyan College in Miltonvale, Kansas.

Gleason died June 29, 1986, at the Hutchinson Hospital in Hutchinson, Kansas.

== Head coaching record ==
=== Football ===
| Year | Team | Overall | Conference | Standing | Bowl/playoffs |
|---|---|---|---|---|---|
Sterling Warriors (NAIA independent) (1953–1959)
| 1953 | Sterling | 3–6 | | | |
| 1954 | Sterling | 4–4 | | | |
| 1955 | Sterling | 5–2 | | | |
| 1956 | Sterling | 6–3 | | | |
| 1957 | Sterling | 6–3 | | | |
| 1958 | Sterling | 4–4 | | | |
| 1959 | Sterling | 1–7 | | | |
| Sterling: | | 29–29 | | | |
| Total: | | 29–29 | | | |
