= Sam Sample =

American football player and coach

Biographical details
- Born: 1941 or 1942 (age 84–85); Fullerton, Nebraska, U.S.

Playing career
- ?–1963: Hastings

Coaching career (HC unless noted)
- 1968–1971: Dakota Wesleyan
- 1974–1976: Sterling
- 1977–1981: Taylor

Head coaching record
- Overall: 41–66–1

Sam Sample (born 1941 or 1942) is an American former football coach and player. He served as the head football coach at Dakota Wesleyan University from 1968 to 1971, at Sterling College in Sterling, Kansas from 1974 to 1976, and at Taylor University in Upland, Indiana from 1977 to 1981, compiling a career college football coaching record of 41–66–1. He attended Hastings College in Hastings, Nebraska, where lettered in football, basketball, and track. He signed a contract with the Washington Redskins of the National Football League (NFL) in 1963.

== Coaching career ==
Sample was the head football coach at Sterling College in Sterling, Kansas for three seasons, from 1974 to 1976, compiling a record of 9–18–1.

== Head coaching record ==
Year	Team	Overall	Conference	Standing	Bowl/playoffs
Dakota Wesleyan Tigers (South Dakota Intercollegiate Conference) (1968–1971)
1968	Dakota Wesleyan	6–3	3–3	4th	
1969	Dakota Wesleyan	5–4	3–3	T–3rd	
1970	Dakota Wesleyan	3–6	2–4	5th	
1971	Dakota Wesleyan	2–7	0–6	7th	
Dakota Wesleyan:		16–20	8–16		
Sterling Warriors (Kansas Collegiate Athletic Conference) (1974–1976)
1974	Sterling	1–8	1–7	9th	
1975	Sterling	4–4–1	4–3–1	5th	
1976	Sterling	5–4	5–3	T–2nd	
Sterling:		10–16–1	10–13–1		
Taylor Trojans (Hoosier–Buckeye Conference) (1977–1981)
1977	Taylor	5–4	4–4	5th	
1978	Taylor	2–7	2–6	T–7th	
1979	Taylor	1–8	1–7	8th	
1980	Taylor	2–7	2–6	T–6th	
1981	Taylor	4–5	3–5	T–6th	
Taylor:		14–31	12–28		
Total:		40–67–1			
