= 1905 Cooper vs. Fairmount football game =

Cooper vs. Fairmount First night football game west of the Mississippi River
| Cooper Barrelmakers | Fairmount Wheatshockers |
| 0 | 24 |
| Head coach: unknown | Head coach: Willis Bates |
| | 1 | 2 | 3 | 4 | Total |
|---|---|---|---|---|---|
| Cooper | 0 | 0 | 0 | 0 | 0 |
| Fairmount | 6 | 6 | 6 | 6 | 24 |
- Date: October 6, 1905
- Season: 1905
- Stadium: Association Park
- Location: Wichita, Kansas

The 1905 Cooper vs. Fairmount football game was a college football game between the Cooper Barrelmakers of Coopper College (now Sterling College) and the Fairmount Wheatshockers of Fairmount College (now Wichita State University) played on October 6, 1905, at Association Park in Wichita, Kansas. The game was played at night under gas lamps as a demonstration by the Coleman Company and was the first night football game played west of the Mississippi River. Fairmount won by a score of 24–0.

== Aftermath ==
Several other attempts had been made in the eastern United States toward the means of playing football at night, beginning in 1892 with the first night football game that ended at halftime. Since that game, other attempts in the east grew to be successful, but this was the first time such an attempt was made west of the Mississippi River. The use of lighting was considered successful.

== See also ==
- 1892 Wyoming Seminary vs. Mansfield State Normal football game
- Timeline of college football in Kansas
