= Duane Wilson (American football) =

American football and basketball coach and college athletics administrator

Biographical details
- Born: September 22, 1922; New Wilmington, Pennsylvania, U.S.
- Died: August 18, 2000 (aged 77); Council Bluffs, Iowa, U.S.

Coaching career (HC unless noted)
- 1946–1948: Sterling
- 1953: York
- 1957–1960: Westmar

Administrative career (AD unless noted)
- ?–1949: Sterling
- ?: Westmar

Head coaching record
- Overall: 18–42–4

Duane G. "Tiny" Wilson (September 22, 1922 – August 18, 2000) was an American football and basketball coach and college athletics administrator. He served as the head football coach at Sterling College in Sterling, Kansas from 1946 to 1948, York College in York, Nebraska in 1953, and Westmar University in Le Mars, Iowa from 1957 to 1960, compiling a career college football coaching record of 18–42–4. Wilson was also the athletic director and head basketball coach at Sterling.

A native of Pennsylvania, Wilson earned a Bachelor of Arts degree from Sterling College and, in 1952, he received a Master of Arts degree from Westminster College in New Wilmington, Pennsylvania. He also did postgraduate work at Pennsylvania State University from 1948 to 1948.

== Head coaching record ==
Year	Team	Overall	Conference	Standing	Bowl/playoffs
Sterling Warriors (Independent) (1946–1948)
1946	Sterling	1–8			
1947	Sterling	1–8			
1948	Sterling	3–4–1			
Sterling:		5–20–1			
York Panthers (Independent) (1953)
1953	York	0–5			
York:		0–5			
Westmar Eagles (Central Church College Conference) (1957)
1957	Westmar	6–2–1	2–1	2nd	
Westmar Eagles (NAIA independent) (1958–1959)
1958	Westmar	1–7			
1959	Westmar	3–4–1			
Westmar Eagles (Tri-State Conference) (1960)
1960	Westmar	3–4–1	3–2–1	4th	
Westmar:		13–17–3	5–3–1		
Total:		18–37–4			
