= Bill Bauer (American football) =

American football coach

Coaching career (HC unless noted)
- 1994–1996: Sterling

Head coaching record
- Overall: 7–23

Bill Bauer is an American football coach. He served as the head football coach at Sterling College in Sterling, Kansas for three seasons, from 1994 to 1996, compiling a record 7–23.

== Head coaching record ==
Year	Team	Overall	Conference	Standing	Bowl/playoffs
Sterling Warriors (Kansas Collegiate Athletic Conference) (1994–1996)
1994	Sterling	2–8	2–6	7th	
1995	Sterling	3–7	3–5	7th	
1996	Sterling	2–8	2–6	7th	
Sterling:		7–23	7–17		
Total:		7–23			
