= Kim Raynor =

American football coach

Coaching career (HC unless noted)
- 1990–1993: Sterling

Head coaching record
- Overall: 13–26

Kim Raynor is an American former football coach. He served as the head football coach at Sterling College in Sterling, Kansas for four seasons, from 1990 to 1993, compiling a record 13–26.

== Head coaching record ==
Year	Team	Overall	Conference	Standing	Bowl/playoffs
Sterling Warriors (Kansas Collegiate Athletic Conference) (1990–1993)
1990	Sterling	1–9	1–8	T–9th	
1991	Sterling	4–6	3–6	T–6th	
1992	Sterling	2–7	2–6	T–7th	
1993	Sterling	6–4	6–2	2nd	
Sterling:		13–26	12–22		
Total:		13–26			
