= Lou Odle =

American football coach

Coaching career (HC unless noted)
- 1940–1941: Sterling

Head coaching record
- Overall: 7–10–2

Lou Odle was an American football coach. He served as the head football coach at Sterling College in Sterling, Kansas for two seasons, from 1940 to 1941, compiling a record of 7–10–2.

== Head coaching record ==
Year	Team	Overall	Conference	Standing	Bowl/playoffs
Sterling Warriors (Independent) (1940–1941)
1940	Sterling	4–5–1			
1941	Sterling	3–5–1			
Sterling:		7–10–2			
Total:		7–10–2			
