= T. E. McDonald =

American football coach

Biographical details
- Education: University of Iowa

Coaching career (HC unless noted)
- 1920: Sterling

Head coaching record
- Overall: 0–7–1

T. E. McDonald was an American football coach. He served as the head football coach at Sterling College in Sterling, Kansas for one season, in 1920, compiling a record of 0–7–1. McDonald was an alumnus of the University of Iowa.

== Head coaching record ==
Year	Team	Overall	Conference	Standing	Bowl/playoffs
Sterling Warriors (Kansas Collegiate Athletic Conference) (1920)
1920	Sterling	0–7–1	0–7–1	14th	
Sterling:		0–7–1	0–7–1		
Total:		0–7–1			
