= Gary D. White =

American football coach

Coaching career (HC unless noted)
- 1984–1987: Sterling

Head coaching record
- Overall: 25–14

Gary D. White is an American former football coach. He served as the head football coach at Sterling College in Sterling, Kansas for four seasons, from 1984 to 1987, compiling a record 25–14.

White, who graduated from Sterling College in 1972, was awarded the Sterling College Alumni Award in 2017.

== Head coaching record ==
Year	Team	Overall	Conference	Standing	Bowl/playoffs
Sterling Warriors (Kansas Collegiate Athletic Conference) (1984–1987)
1984	Sterling	6–3	6–3	3rd	
1985	Sterling	7–3	6–3	4th	
1986	Sterling	6–4	6–3	T–4th	
1987	Sterling	6–4	6–3	4th	
Sterling:		25–14	24–12		
Total:		25–14			
