= Lorin Helm =

American football coach

Biographical details
- Born: August 15, 1920; Plevna, Kansas, U.S.
- Died: March 4, 1945 (aged 24); Sterling, Kansas, U.S.

Coaching career (HC unless noted)
- 1942: Sterling

Head coaching record
- Overall: 0–8

Lorin Edwin Helm (August 15, 1920 – May 4, 1945) was an American football coach. He served as the head football coach at Sterling College in Sterling, Kansas for one season, in 1942, compiling a record of 0–8.

== Head coaching record ==
Year	Team	Overall	Conference	Standing	Bowl/playoffs
Sterling Warriors (Independent) (1942)
1942	Sterling	0–8			
Sterling:		0–8			
Total:		0–8			
