= Robert Mistele =

American football coach (1920–2011)

Biographical details
- Born: June 8, 1920; Detroit, Michigan, U.S.
- Died: September 22, 2011 (aged 91); Floyd, Virginia, U.S.

Coaching career (HC unless noted)
- 1962–1963: Sterling

Head coaching record
- Overall: 3–14–1

Robert Stanley Mistele (June 8, 1920 – September 22, 2011) was an American football coach. He served as the head football coach at Sterling College in Sterling, Kansas for two seasons, from 1962 to 1963, compiling a record of 3–14–1. Prior to coaching at Sterling, Mistele coached high school football for 13 years in the states of Michigan, Texas, and Oklahoma. He was also a founder and member of the Fellowship of Christian Athletes. Mistele died in 2011.

== Head coaching record ==
Year	Team	Overall	Conference	Standing	Bowl/playoffs
Sterling Warriors (Kansas Collegiate Athletic Conference) (1962–1963)
1962	Sterling	1–7–1	1–7–1	T–8th	
1963	Sterling	2–7	2–7	9th	
Sterling:		3–14–1	3–14–1		
Total:		3–14–1			
