= Ralph Kirby (American football) =

American football coach

Coaching career (HC unless noted)
- 1934: Sterling

Head coaching record
- Overall: 0–8

Ralph Kirby was an American football coach. He served as the head football coach at Sterling College in Sterling, Kansas for one season, in 1934, compiling a record of 0–8.

== Head coaching record ==
| Year | Team | Overall | Conference | Standing | Bowl/playoffs |
|---|---|---|---|---|---|
Sterling Warriors (Independent) (1934)
| 1934 | Sterling | 0–8 | | | |
| Sterling: | | 0–8 | | | |
| Total: | | 0–8 | | | |
