= Dunn Field =

Dunn Field may refer to the following stadiums in the United States:

- Dunn Field (Elmira, New York)
- Dunn Field, the 1921–1927 name for League Park in Cleveland, Ohio
