= Reggie Langford Jr. =

American football coach (born c. 1993)

Current position
- Title: Head coach
- Team: Sterling
- Conference: KCAC
- Record: 3–19

Biographical details
- Born: c. 1993 (age 32–33); Rancho Cordova, California, U.S.
- Education: Sterling College (2015); Pittsburg State University (2017); Fort Hays State University (2022)

Playing career
- 2011–2014: Sterling
- 2016: Salina Liberty
- 2016–2017: Pardubice Stallions
- 2018–2019: Vysočina Gladiators
- Position: Quarterback

Coaching career (HC unless noted)
- 2015: Sterling (QB)
- 2016–2017: Pardubice Stallions (OC)
- 2017–2020: Nickerson HS (KS) (OC)
- 2018–2019: Vysočina Gladiators (OC)
- 2021: Nickerson HS (KS)
- 2022: Bethel (KS) (OC)
- 2023: Sterling (AHC/OC)
- 2024–present: Sterling

Head coaching record
- Overall: 3–19 (college); 1–8 (high school)

Reggie Langford Jr. (born c. 1993) is an American football coach. He is the head football coach for Sterling College, a position he has held since 2024. He was the head football coach for Nickerson High School in 2021. He also coached for the Pardubice Stallions and Vysočina Gladiators in the Czech League of American Football and for Bethel College in Kansas. He played college football for Sterling as a quarterback. He played for the Pardubice Stallions and Vysočina Gladiators as well as the Salina Liberty of the Champions Indoor Football (CIF).

== Head coaching record ==
=== College ===
Year	Team	Overall	Conference	Standing	Bowl/playoffs
Sterling Warriors (Kansas Collegiate Athletic Conference) (2024–present)
2024	Sterling	2–9	2–3	4th (Bissell)	
2025	Sterling	1–10	0–5	6th (Bissell)	
2026	Sterling	0–0	0–0	(Bissell)	
Sterling:		3–19	2–8		
Total:		3–19			

=== High school ===
Year	Team	Overall	Conference	Standing	Bowl/playoffs
Nickerson Panthers () (2021)
2021	Nickerson	1–8			
Nickerson:		1–8			
Total:		1–8			
