= Smisor Stadium =

Stadium in Sterling, Kansas, USA

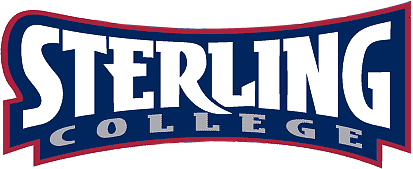
- Interactive map of Smisor Stadium
- Address: Sterling, KS; United States
- Coordinates: 38°13′05″N 98°12′32″W
- Owner: Sterling College
- Operator: Sterling College Athletics
- Capacity: 3,000
- Type: Stadium
- Surface: Natural grass
- Current use: Football

Construction
- Renovated: 2008
- Cost: $1.5 million (2008 renovation)

Tenant
- Sterling College Warriors football

Website
- scwarriors.com/smisor-stadium

Smisor Stadium is a stadium located on the campus of Sterling College in Sterling, Kansas.

The facility is primarily used by the Sterling Warriors college football team. The stadium is also used for local high school and other community events.
