= Doris Fleeson =

American journalist and columnist (1901–1970)

- Doris Fleeson (right) with Eleanor Roosevelt
- Born: May 20, 1901; Sterling, Kansas, US
- Died: August 1, 1970 (aged 69); Washington, D.C., US
- Other name: Doris Fleeson Kimball
- Education: University of Kansas (BA 1923)
- Occupation: Journalist
- Spouses: John O'Donnell (1930–1942); Dan A. Kimball (1958–1970)

Doris Fleeson (May 20, 1901 – August 1, 1970) was an American journalist and columnist. She was the first woman in the United States to have a nationally syndicated political column.

== Early life ==
Fleeson was born in Sterling, Kansas, on May 20, 1901, to clothing store manager, William Fleeson, and Helen Fleeson (née Tebbe). She was the youngest of six children. In 1918, she graduated from Sterling High School, where she was the class valedictorian.

In 1918, Fleeson attended Sterling College, then known as Cooper College, for an academic year. Fleeson went on to attend and receive a B.A. in economics from the University of Kansas in 1923.

== Career ==
=== Early career ===
Fleeson's first journalism job was at the Pittsburg Sun. She moved to Evanston, Illinois, to become the society editor of the News-Index and then to Long Island, New York to be an editor at Great Neck News. In 1927, she joined the New York Daily News as a general assignment reporter, eventually moving to the newspaper's Albany bureau to cover state politics.

=== Washington career ===
Fleeson and her husband, fellow Daily News reporter John O'Donnell, moved to Washington D.C. to work on at the Daily News's Washington bureau in 1930. They started a column together called "Capital Stuff" in 1933 that was published until their divorce in 1942. She left the Daily News in 1943 to be a war correspondent for Woman's Home Companion. She reported from France and Italy during the war before returning to Washington to write a political column for the Boston Globe and Washington Evening Star. In 1945, the column was picked up by the Bell Syndicate and distributed across the country. At its height in 1960, her column ran in about 100 newspapers.

== Honors and memberships ==
- 1957: Fleeson received an honorary degree (Doctor of Humane Letters, honoris causa) from The Sage Colleges, the former Russell Sage College.
- 1954: Raymond Clapper Memorial Award, the American Society of Newspaper Editors
- New York Paperwoman's Club for Distinguished Reporting, twice
- Member, Women's National Press Club

== Personal life and death ==
In 1930, Fleeson married New York Daily News colleague, John O'Donnell, with whom she had a daughter, Doris O'Donnell. The marriage ended in divorce in 1942.

In 1958, Fleeson married Dan A. Kimball, who had been Secretary of the Navy from 1951 to 1953, and later was President of Aerojet. Eleanor Roosevelt attended the wedding, as did financier Bernard Baruch.

On August 1, 1970, Fleeson died at home in Washington, D.C., of complications from a stroke shortly after her husband's death. She was buried with him in Arlington National Cemetery.
