= 1892 Wyoming Seminary vs. Mansfield Normal football game =

First night-time American football game

- First night football game
Wyoming Seminary	Mansfield Normal
0	0
Head coach: J. H. Race	Head coach: Samuel Sprole
	1	2	Total
Wyoming Seminary	0	0	0
Mansfield Normal	0	0	0
- Date: September 28, 1892
- Season: 1892
- Stadium: Smythe Park
- Location: Mansfield, Pennsylvania

The 1892 Wyoming Seminary vs. Mansfield Normal football game, played September 28, 1892, was the first-ever American football game played at night.

The game was played between Wyoming Seminary (a private college preparatory school located in the Wyoming Valley of Northeastern Pennsylvania) and Mansfield Normal School in Mansfield, Pennsylvania. During the time period, it was common for a college and high school to play each other in football—a practice that has long since been discontinued.

== Game summary ==
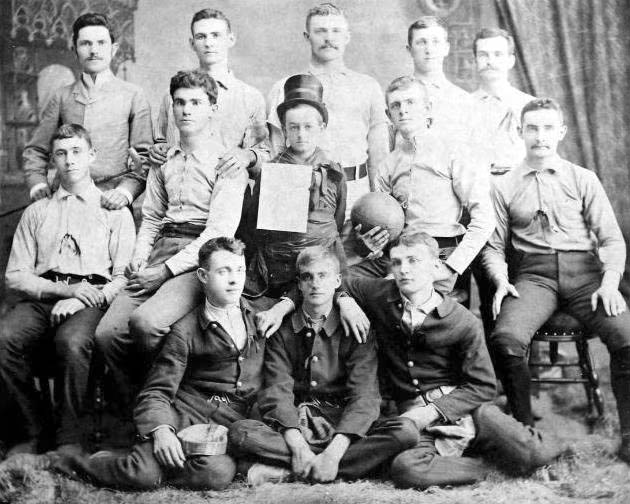
Mansfield's 1891 football team, which went 3–1 on the season

The lighting system brought in turned out to be inadequate for gameplay The game itself lasted only 20 minutes and there were only 10 plays. Both sides agreed to end at halftime with a 0–0 tie after several players had an unfortunate run-in with a light pole.

== References in modern culture ==
=== Annual reenactment ===
This historic game is celebrated by a yearly reenactment of the original game played between Wyoming Seminary and Mansfield Normal School during an autumn festival known as the "Fabulous 1890s Weekend." The re-enactment of the game is a play-by-play version of the actual game as recorded. Fans who watch the game are sometimes known to correct players when they deviate from the original recorded plays.

=== 100th anniversary ===
The 100th anniversary of the game happened to occur on Monday, September 28, 1992. Monday Night Football celebrated "100 years of night football" with a game between the Los Angeles Raiders and the Kansas City Chiefs at Arrowhead Stadium. The Chiefs won 27–7 in front of 77,486 fans.

== See also ==
- 1879 VFA season, for a description of the first night game in Australian rules football
- 1905 Cooper vs. Fairmount football game
- Kanaweola Athletic Club, hosts of the first professional football night game
- List of historically significant college football games
