= Carls =

Carls is a surname. Notable people with the surname include:

- Carl Carls (1880–1958), a German chess master
- Rolf Carls (1885–1945), a Generaladmiral of the Kriegsmarine during World War II
- Stephen Carls, chair of the history department at Union University in Jackson, Tennessee
