= Warren Woody =

American football player and coach (1897–1982)

Biographical details
- Born: October 13, 1897; Sterling, Kansas, U.S.
- Died: December 21, 1982 (aged 85); Skokie, Illinois, U.S.

Playing career
- 1916–1917: Kansas
- 1920: Kansas

Coaching career (HC unless noted)
- 1922–1924: Sterling

Head coaching record
- Overall: 17–7–2

Accomplishments and honors

Championships
- 1 KCAC (1923)

Warren V. Woody Sr. (October 13, 1897 – December 21, 1982) was an American football coach. He was the head football coach at Sterling College in Sterling, Kansas for three seasons, from 1922 to 1924 compiling a record of 17–7–2.

Woody played for the Kansas Jayhawks in Lawrence, Kansas, lettering in 1916, 1917, and 1920. He was instrumental among alumni in establishing a recurring and philanthropic connection between his alma mater and the state of Illinois. He died in Skokie, Illinois in 1982 after an illness.

== Head coaching record ==
Year	Team	Overall	Conference	Standing	Bowl/playoffs
Sterling Warriors (Kansas Collegiate Athletic Conference) (1922–1924)
1922	Sterling	4–4	4–4	T–8th	
1923	Sterling	7–1–1	7–1–1	1st	
1924	Sterling	6–2–1	6–2–1	3rd	
Sterling:		17–7–2	17–7–2		
Total:		17–7–2			
National championship Conference title Conference division title or championship game berth
