= Ralph Kirby =

Ralph Kirby may refer to:

- Conyers Kirby (1884–1946), also known as Ralph Kirby, English footballer
- Ralph Kirby (American football), American football coach
