= Andy Lambert =

American football coach

Biographical details
- Education: Trinity International University

Coaching career (HC unless noted)
- 1997–2003: Trinity International
- 2004–2015: Sterling
- 2016–2019: Southern Nazarene
- 2020: Eastern Michigan (def. analyst)
- 2021–2023: Concordia (IL)

Head coaching record
- Overall: 120–152
- Bowls: 0–1
- Tournaments: 0–1 (NAIA playoffs)

Accomplishments and honors

Championships
- 1 KCAC (2013); 1 MSFA Midwest (2003)

Andy Lambert is an American college football coach. He was the head football coach at Concordia University Chicago from 2021 to 2023. Lambert served as the head football coach at Trinity International University in Deerfield, Illinois from 1997 to 2003, Sterling College in Sterling, Kansas from 2004 to 2015, and Southern Nazarene University in Bethany, Oklahoma from 2016 to 2019.

== Coaching career ==
=== Trinity International ===
Lambert was the head coach at Trinity International University in Deerfield, Illinois from 1997 through 2003. His record at Trinity was 22 wins and 11 losses. In 2003 he was named "Coach of the Year" by the Mideast League in the Mid-States Football Association. During his time at Trinity International University he coached his favorite team in 2001. Top seniors included Mark Clinton, Gilbert Crispin, Quincy Sands, Ben Youngkin and Mike Torres. That team was a bootleg in overtime away from making his first NAIA playoff appearance, where senior linebacker Chris Michelson missed a tackle as the sidelines warned him of the play. They ended going to the NCCAA Championship where Adam Warner had his best long-snapping game in his career as the team punted often losing 54–14 to Gardner Webb. Notable contributions in the season came from Scout Team All-Americans, Daniel Clay and Chad Cox.

=== Sterling ===
Lambert was the head football coach at Sterling College in Sterling, Kansas from 2004 to 2015. Sterling won the program's first Kansas Collegiate Athletic Conference (KCAC) championship in 2013.

=== Southern Nazarene ===
After the 2015 season, Lambert accepted the position as the head coach at Southern Nazarene University starting with the 2016 season.

=== Eastern Michigan ===
Lambert spent time as a Defensive Analyst at Eastern Michigan prior to taking the job at Concordia.

=== Concordia (IL) ===
On May 3, 2021, Lambert was hired as the new head football coach for the Concordia Cougars.

== Head coaching record ==
Year	Team	Overall	Conference	Standing	Bowl/playoffs	NAIA^{#}
Trinity International Trojans (Mid-States Football Association) (1997–2003)
1997	Trinity International	1–9	1–5	T–5th (MWL)		
1998	Trinity International	2–8	2–4	T–4th (MWL)		
1998	Trinity International	1–9	0–6	7th (MWL)		
2000	Trinity International	4–7	1–6	7th (MWL)		
2001	Trinity International	8–4	4–3	T–3rd (MWL)	L Victory	
2002	Trinity International	6–5	3–4	5th (MWL)		
2003	Trinity International	8–3	5–2	T–1st (MWL)		
Trinity International:		30–45	16–40			
Sterling Warriors (Kansas Collegiate Athletic Conference) (2004–2015)
2004	Sterling	5–5	5–4	T–2nd		
2005	Sterling	5–4	5–4	4th		
2006	Sterling	7–3	7–2	T–3rd		
2007	Sterling	8–2	7–2	3rd		
2008	Sterling	7–3	7–2	T–2nd		
2009	Sterling	6–4	5–4	4th		
2010	Sterling	7–3	6–3	T–3rd		
2011	Sterling	1–10	1–8	10th		
2012	Sterling	3–7	3–6	T–7th		
2013	Sterling	9–3	8–1	1st	L NAIA First Round	15
2014	Sterling	7–4	7–2	T–2nd		
2015	Sterling	7–3	7–2	3rd		
Sterling:		72–51	68–40			
Southern Nazarene Crimson Storm (Great American Conference) (2016–2019)
2016	Southern Nazarene	2–9	2–9	T–10th		
2017	Southern Nazarene	4–7	4–7	9th		
2018	Southern Nazarene	3–8	3–8	T–9th		
2019	Southern Nazarene	2–9	2–9	11th		
Southern Nazarene:		11–33	11–33			
Concordia Cougars (Northern Athletics Collegiate Conference) (2021–2023)
2021	Concordia	3–7	1–7	T–8th		
2022	Concordia	3–7	2–6	T–7th		
2023	Concordia	1–9	1–7	T–8th		
Concordia:		7–23	4–20			
Total:		120–152				
National championship Conference title Conference division title or championship game berth
