= Stephen Carls =

American historian (born 1944)

Stephen Douglas Carls is University Professor Emeritus of History at Union University in Jackson, Tennessee. Carls began teaching at Union in 1983 and taught there until his retirement in 2023. In addition to his teaching responsibilities at Union, Carls served as the history department chair from 1990 to 2023. The Union University Alumni Association recognized Carls in 2008 with its Distinguished Faculty/Staff Award, and in the fall of 2022, the university named him to its Bicentennial Hall of Honor as one of one hundred individuals who had contributed significantly to Union’s vision and mission since its founding in 1823. He is a specialist of modern France, the First World War, and Europe between the two world wars.

== Biography ==
Born to Ernest and Eleanor Carls in 1944, Carls grew up in Minneapolis, Minnesota. He majored in history in college, earning a B.A. with honor from Wheaton College in Illinois in 1966. As part of his undergraduate studies, Carls spent his junior year in Paris, France, studying at the Institute of European Studies, which today is known as the Institute for the International Education of Students (IES Abroad). Carls received his M.A. (1968) and Ph.D. (1982) in modern European history from the University of Minnesota. Joining the faculty at Sterling College in Sterling, Kansas, in 1971, Carls taught there until 1983 when he moved to Union. He is married to Alice-Catherine Carls, and they have three children: Philip, Elizabeth, and Paul.

== Memberships ==
A member of Phi Alpha Theta National History Honor Society since 1970, Carls served as the advisor to Union University’s Delta-Psi chapter for 40 years, from 1983 to 2023. Under his leadership, the Delta-Psi chapter won 17 national Best Chapter Awards. Nationally, he served the society as a council member (2006-2008), advisory board member (2008-2012), vice president (2012-2014), president (2014-2016), and chair of the advisory board (2016-2018). Phi Alpha Theta’s national office gave service awards to Carls in 2010 and 2014 for his dedication to the society. At its biennial convention in San Antonio in January 2020, the society named Carls an honorary dean of Phi Alpha Theta. Carls is also a member of the American Historical Association, the Southern Historical Association, and the Society for French Historical Studies. From 1996 to 2008, he served as the faculty advisor to Union University’s Lambda Zeta chapter of Lambda Chi Alpha fraternity.

== Scholarship ==
Carls authored a book on the life of Louis Loucheur, an early twentieth-century Frenchman. An expanded version of the book was published in France under the title Louis Loucheur, 1872-1931: Ingénieur, homme d’état, modernisateur de la France.

Carls has also coauthored with his wife a textbook titled Europe from War to War, 1914-1945, that Routledge released in 2017. A French translation of the book called L'Europe d'une guerre à l'autre: 1914-1945 was published in 2020 by the Presses universitaires du Septentrion.

== Education ==
- B.A. (1966) from Wheaton College.
- M.A. (1968) from University of Minnesota.
- Ph.D. (1982) from University of Minnesota.

== Selected works ==
- Louis Loucheur and the Shaping of Modern France, 1916-1931. Baton Rouge: Louisiana State University Press, 1993.
- Louis Loucheur: Ingénieur, homme d’état, modernisateur de la France 1872-1931. Translated by Alice-Catherine Carls. Preface by Emmanuel Chadeau. Villeneuve d’Ascq : Presses universitaires du Septentrion, 2000.
- Coauthored with Alice-Catherine Carls. Europe from War to War, 1914-1945. London: Routledge, 2018.
- Coauthored with Alice-Catherine Carls. L’Europe d’une guerre à l’autre : 1914-1945. Translated by Alice-Catherine Carls. Villeneuve d’Ascq : Presses universitaires du Septentrion, 2020.
