= John O'Donnell (political journalist) =

American journalist

- Born: John Parsons O'Donnell; July 23, 1896; Somerville, Massachusetts
- Died: December 17, 1961 (aged 65); Georgetown University in Washington, D.C.
- Occupation: Journalist
- Spouse(s): Kathryn Mullin (m. 1927–1929) Doris Fleeson (m. 1930–1942)
- Children: Doris O'Donnell

John Parsons O'Donnell (July 23, 1896 – December 17, 1961) was an American political journalist primarily known for his lengthy tenure as chief of the New York Daily News Washington bureau and as the writer of its Capitol Stuff column. Born in Somerville, Massachusetts, to a wealthy physician, O'Donnell pursued his education at Tufts College, graduating in 1920, followed by further studies at Harvard University and Dijon University in Europe. He served as an infantry lieutenant in World War I.

His career in political journalism began in 1923 as a reporter at the New York American owned by William Randolph Hearst. In 1927, he joined the New York Daily News, where he gained recognition for his political journalism, covering significant events such as Franklin D. Roosevelt's 1933 presidential inauguration and serving as a correspondent during World War II, reporting from the Maginot Line in France.

Throughout World War II, O'Donnell's journalism reflected the right-wing political biases of his publisher, William Randolph Hearst, which included shifting from initial admiration to harsh criticism of President Roosevelt. In response, Roosevelt gave a fellow journalist an Iron Cross to give to O'Donnell. O'Donnell later reported allegations of sexual promiscuity in the Women's Army Corps and also an antisemitic conspiracy theory about General George S. Patton's removal. O'Donnell's reporting in both incidents was discredited, and his publisher retracted the columns.

== Early life and education ==
Born in Somerville, Massachusetts, O'Donnell was the son of a doctor. He graduated from Tufts College in 1920 with a B.A. degree. He then did graduate work at Harvard University and Dijon University. O'Donnell then served as an infantry lieutenant in World War I.

== Journalist career ==
=== Roosevelt criticism ===
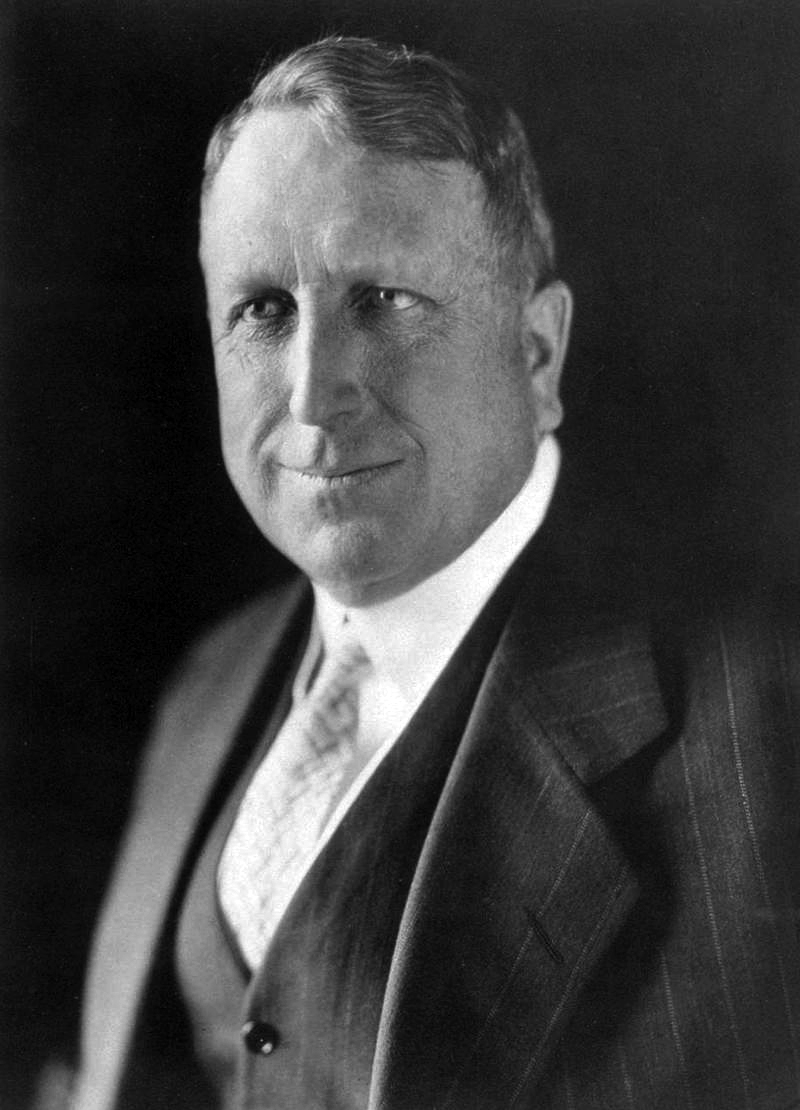
William Randolph Hearst

In 1923, O'Donnell became a reporter and assistant city editor at the New York American, a post he held until 1927, when he joined the New York Daily News. After others noticed his knack for political journalism, he was assigned to report on Franklin D. Roosevelt's 1933 presidential inauguration. In 1939, after World War II broke out, he became a correspondent for the Daily News; in this capacity, he spent time with the British military's forces on the Maginot Line in France.

O'Donnell followed his publisher William Randolph Hearst's turn from admiration to intense criticism of President Roosevelt. In December 1942, Roosevelt gave an Iron Cross to newsman Earl Godwin and asked that it be given to O'Donnell. Roosevelt cited O'Donnell's reporting on former White House correspondent George Durno, viewed by other reporters as the President's favorite, as the reason for this gesture, which the Chicago Tribune criticized as a "new low in vilification".

=== WAAC controversy ===
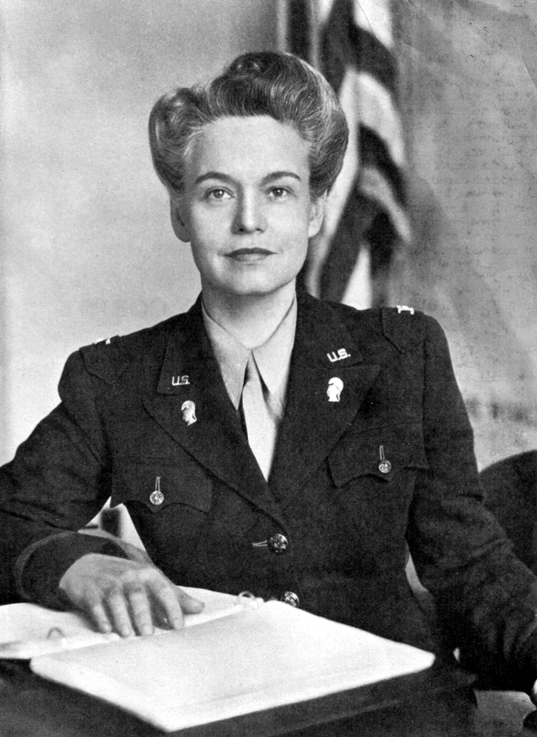
Oveta Culp Hobby

In June 1943, O'Donnell's Capitol Stuff column did "incalculable damage" to the Women's Army Corps, thwarting recruiting efforts in wartime. O'Donnell claimed that "contraceptives and prophylactic equipment will be furnished to members of the WAACS, according to a super secret agreement reached by the high ranking officers of the War Department and the WAAC chieftain, Mrs. William Pettus Hobby." This followed O'Donnell's June 7 column discussing efforts of women journalists and congresswomen to dispel "the gaudy stories of the gay and careless way in which the young ladies in uniform ... disport themselves."

Although O'Donnell's allegations were refuted and the column was hastily retracted, the "fat was in the fire. The morals of the WAACs became a topic of general discussion." Denials of O'Donnell's fabrications were ineffectual. Three years after O'Donnell's column, "religious publications were still to be found reprinting the story, and actually attributing the columnist's lines to Director Hobby. Director Hobby's picture was labeled 'Astounding Degeneracy'."

=== Patton controversy ===
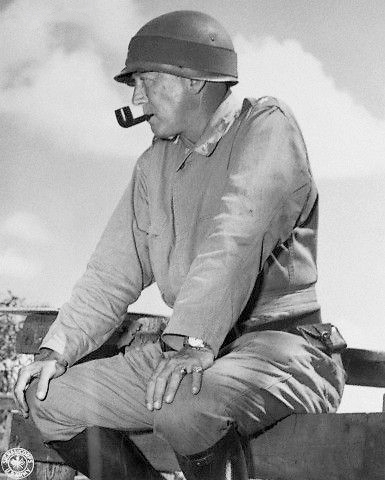
George S. Patton

On October 3, 1945, O'Donnell wrote in his column that General George S. Patton had been removed from his Army command in Bavaria due to "the secret and astoundingly effective might of this republic's foreign-born political leaders — such as Justice of the Supreme Court Felix Frankfurter of Vienna, White House administrative assistant Dave (Devious Dave) Niles, alias Neyhaus, and the Latvian ex-rabbinical student now known as Sidney Hillman." O'Donnell claimed that this pressure came about because the soldier whom Patton had slapped two years earlier, Charles H. Kuehl, was Jewish, and Patton allegedly used antisemitic epithets while slapping him.

Much of O'Donnell's claims proved false. Kuehl was not Jewish, nor was another soldier whom Patton slapped that same month, Paul G. Bennett. All of the officials named denied any involvement in Patton's removal, and Patton himself denied ever making statements "denigrating any soldier's religion" during the slapping incidents. Days later, O'Donnell retracted the column, writing: "On the evidence, our statements in Capitol Stuff were untrue." Numerous advertisers boycotted the Daily News over O'Donnell's blatantly anti-Jewish language.

== Personal life ==
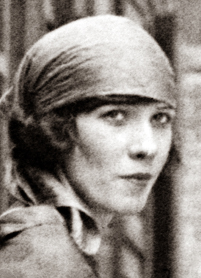
Kathryn Mullin, O'Donnell's first wife

O'Donnell married and divorced three times. His first wife was Kathryn Mullin (1902–1994), a bohemian artist and fencing champion. Mullin was the ex-wife of scenic designer Cleon Throckmorton, and she was known for her radio and stage performances as a ukulele player with the Crandall Saturday Nighters.

As a stage performer, Mullin was billed as "The Girl With the Million Dollar Legs." When not performing, she was a renowned expert in women's saber fencing and gave public exhibitions which attracted hundreds of spectators. Mullin married O'Donnell in a civil ceremony on May 6, 1927, but they divorced soon after in 1929.

His second marriage, in 1930, was to fellow journalist Doris Fleeson; their daughter, Doris, was born two years later. O'Donnell and Fleeson divorced in 1942 after their political views diverged. During his marriage to Fleeson, he worked with her on a column called Capitol Stuff. He died on December 17, 1961, at Georgetown University Hospital in Washington, D.C.
