= Shay Building =

- U.S. National Register of Historic Places
- The Shay Building in 2026

- Location within Kansas Location within the United States
- Location: 202 S. Broadway Ave., Sterling, Kansas
- Coordinates: 38°12′31″N 98°12′24″W
- Area: 0.2 acres (0.081 ha)
- Built: 1906
- Architectural style: Late 19th And Early 20th Century American Movements
- NRHP reference No.: 10000179
- Added to NRHP: April 12, 2010

The Shay Building located at 202 S. Broadway Ave. in Sterling, Kansas, was built in 1906. It was listed on the National Register of Historic Places in 2010.

It is a two-story corner building at Broadway and Monroe Street in Sterling.
