= Kanaweola Athletic Club =

Sports club in Elmira, New York

The Kanaweola Athletic Club was a bicycling club, which later fielded a professional football team, based in Elmira, New York. The club operated an indoor bicycling track inside the Steele Memorial Library building. However, the club is best known for the historical first of its football team.

On Friday, November 21, 1902, at 8:00 pm, Kanaweola took part in the first ever professional football night game. The game took place in Elmira at the Maple Avenue Driving Park (now called Dunn Field). That night Kanaweola was defeated by the Philadelphia Athletics of the first National Football League, 39–0.

The historical significance of the game was initially lost. The town's newspaper, Elmira Daily Advertiser and Free Gazette, only reported on the score of the game, with the headline “Kanaweola Eleven was Brushed Aside, Great Game Just the Same.” It wasn't until decades later that the game was recognized as the first pro football game to be played at night.
