= Dunn Field (Elmira, New York) =

Stadium in Elmira, New York

- The Dunn
- Interactive map of Dunn Field
- Location: 546 Luce Street Elmira, NY 14904
- Coordinates: 42.080296°N 76.780674°W
- Owner: City of Elmira, NY
- Operator: Elmira Baseball Amateur LLC.
- Surface: Grass
- Field size: Left - 325' Left Center - 358' Center - 386' Right Center - 358' Right - 325' Fences are 12' high (20' in LF)

Construction
- Groundbreaking: 1938
- Opened: 1939
- Renovated: 2012
- Expanded: 1993

Tenants
- Elmira Pioneers (PGCBL) (1939–present); Elmira College (2015–present); Elmira Southside High School Baseball; Elmira Southside High School Football

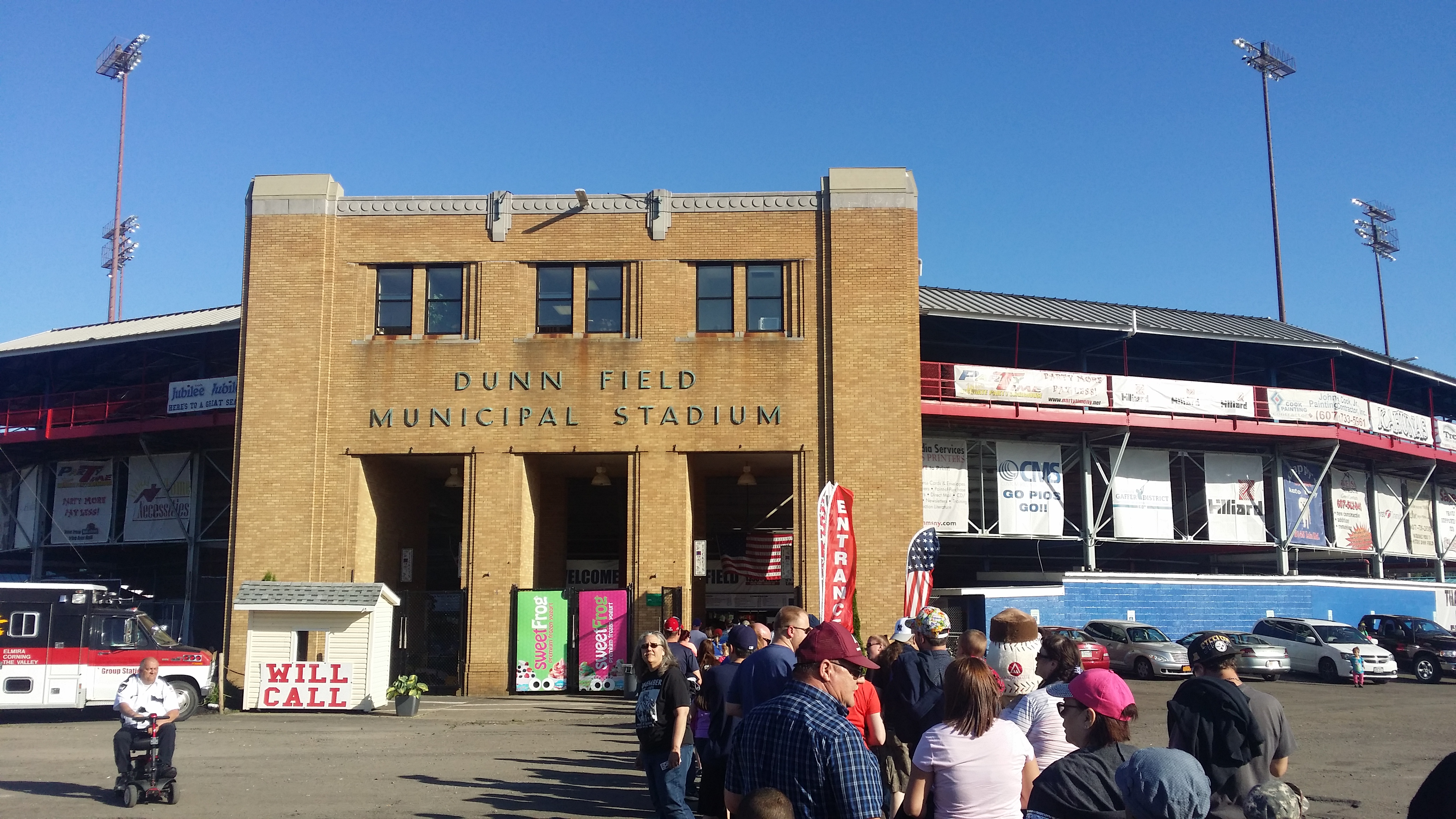
The exterior of Dunn Field in 2017

Dunn Field is a stadium in Elmira, New York primarily used for baseball. Located on the banks of the Chemung River at the end of Luce St, it has been the home of various incarnations of the Elmira Pioneers since its opening in 1939.

== History ==
The first stadium at the site was known as the Maple Avenue Driving Park. On Friday, November 21, 1902, the stadium was the site of the first ever professional football night game. The Philadelphia Athletics football team, of the first National Football League, defeated the Kanaweola Athletic Club, 39–0. The stadium also served as an alternate home for baseball's National League Buffalo Bisons, hosting a doubleheader on October 10, 1885 in what was the last major league games for the team.

The Maple Avenue Driving Park was replaced by Recreation Park, which burned down in 1938. A new stadium built to replace it was named after a local businessman, Edward Joseph Dunn, who donated some land for the stadium to the city.

Besides being the home field of the Elmira Pioneers baseball team, a variety of events have taken place in the stadium over the years, such as wrestling and boxing matches, high school sports, and music concerts (The Beach Boys played there in 1984).

Dunn Field served as the home field for both Elmira Free Academy and Southside High School football teams for many years until each team built their own stadiums. The Erie Bell game was often a special occasion at Dunn Field, since both Elmira Free Academy and Southside High School played their home games at Dunn Field.

Many great baseball players played their home games on this field during part of their minor league years, including Wade Boggs, Curt Schilling, and Jim Palmer. Former player and MLB manager Don Zimmer was even married on Dunn Field in 1951 (pictured in Sports Illustrated magazine, and his autobiography).

== Renovations 2012 ==
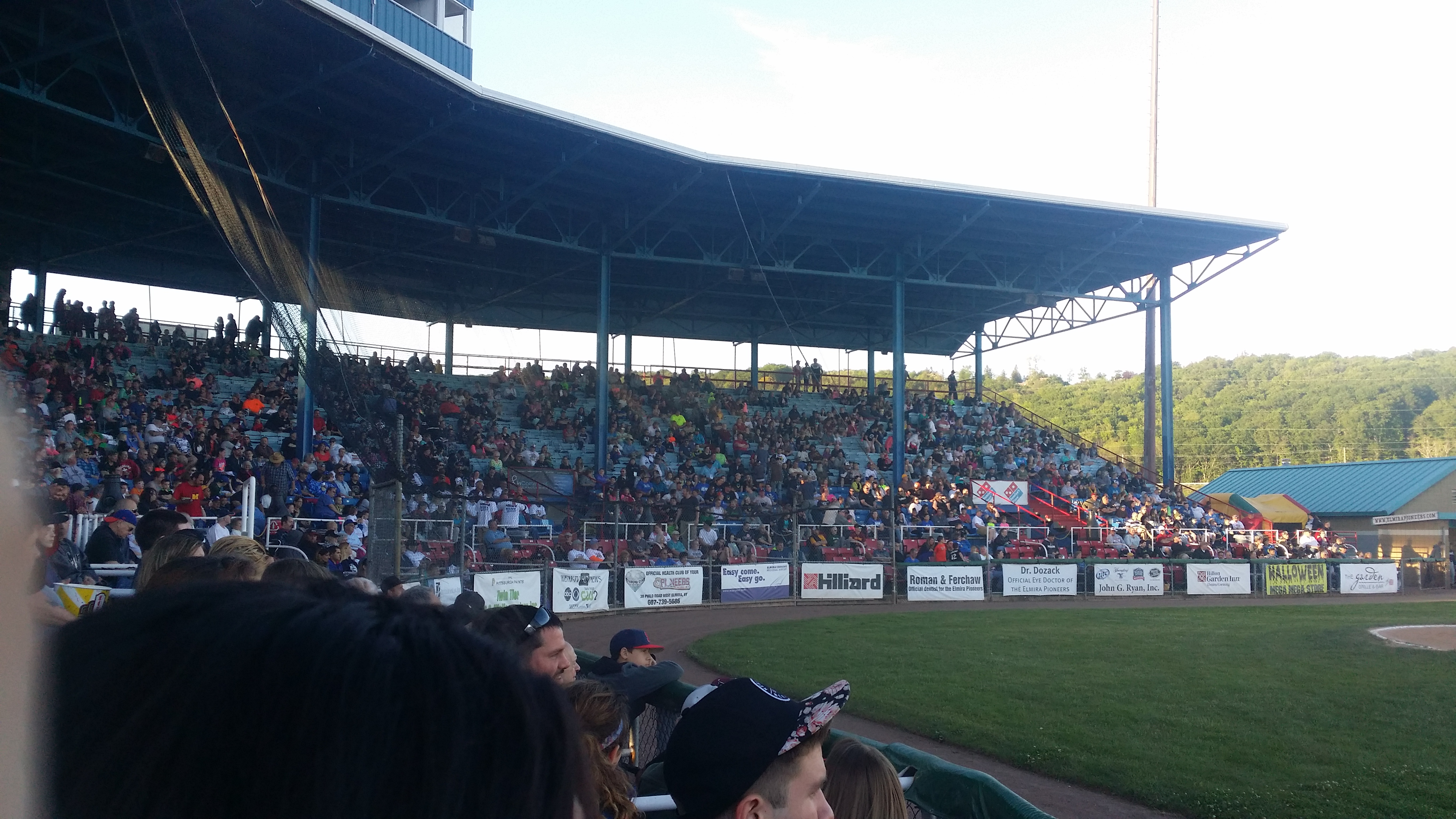
The grandstand of Dunn Field in 2017

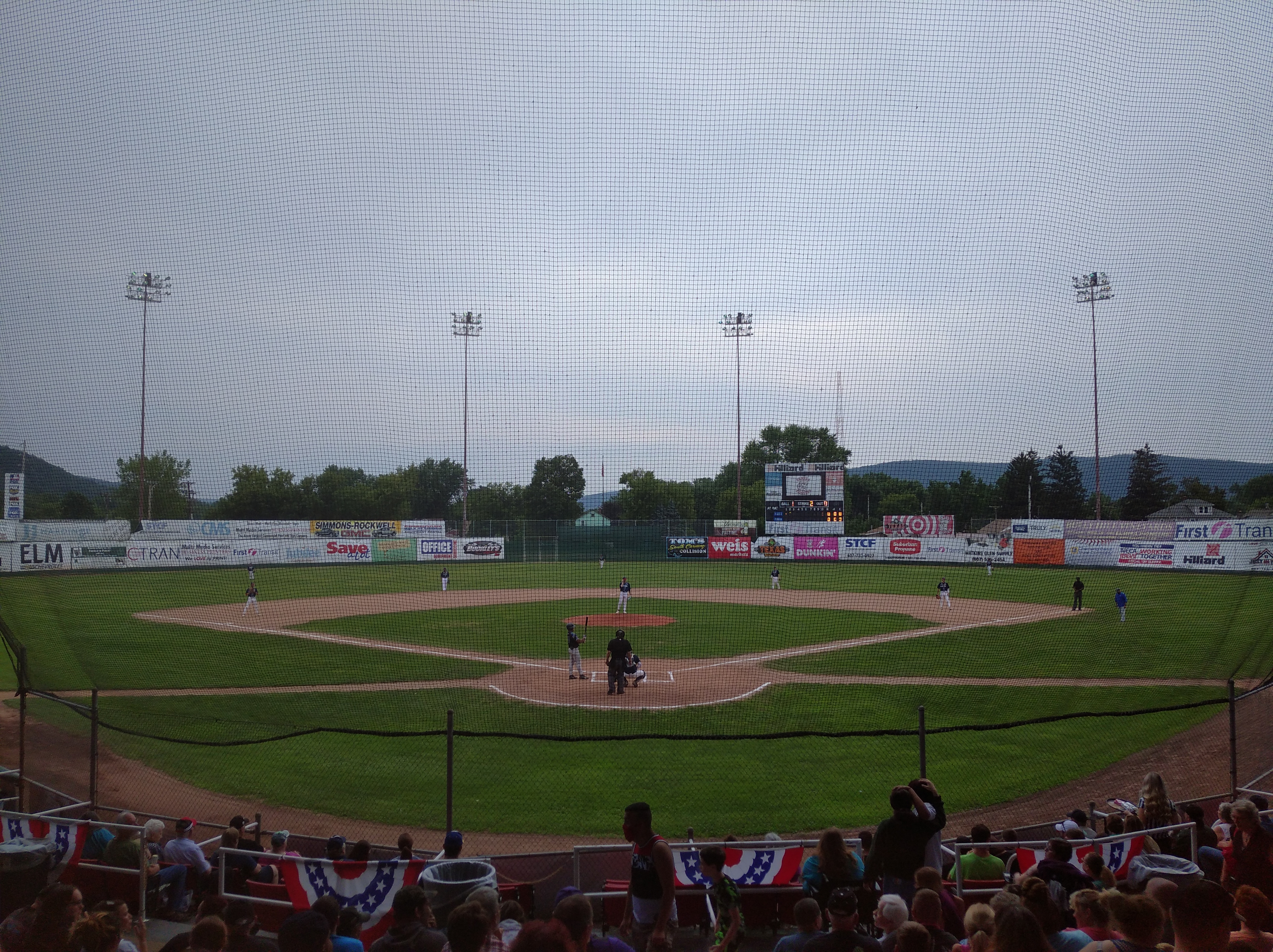
The field of play during a game, 2021

What was supposed to be $12,000 quickly climbed to almost $40,000 in renovations. The work is being paid for by the City of Elmira, owner of the 73 year old stadium, and will go from the entrance way all the way to some of the seating being done and repainted. Bathrooms without tile will be a thing of the past. Most notable is a section of stadium seating ripped out. Robbie Nichols is the new co-owner of the Elmira Pioneers, along with his wife Nellie Franco-Nichols. Workers are now working to fill in that hole with new steel. Other sections of the stadium will also need the same repair.

In addition to a new beer garden, efforts have been taken to honor players. "There were posters hanging in the locker room. You take down a poster and there was either a bat hole or ball hole. We put 10 new sheets of sheet rock up,″ Lewis said. The new locker room and other events are in hopes Dunn Field will return to its once famed reputation for Elmira.

"We want to open it the right way. Have a great impact to the city,” Lewis said.

== Field size ==
Dunn Field has a capacity of 4,020 people, including 312 box seats. Its field dimensions are:

- Left - 325'
- Left Center - 358'
- Center - 386'
- Right Center - 358'
- Right - 325'
- Fences are 12' high (20' in LF).
