= Sterling Warriors =

- University: Sterling College
- NAIA: Region IV
- Conference: Kansas Collegiate Athletic Conference
- Athletic director: Justin Morris
- Location: Sterling, Kansas
- Varsity teams: 23
- Football stadium: Smisor Stadium
- Basketball arena: Gleason Center
- Aquatics center: Gleason Center
- Tennis venue: SC Tennis Courts
- Volleyball arena: Gleason Center
- Nickname: Warriors
- Colors: Navy, cardinal, and silver
- Website: www.scwarriors.com
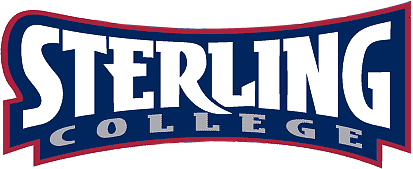

The Sterling Warriors are the athletic teams that represent Sterling College, located in Sterling, Kansas, in intercollegiate sports as a member of the National Association of Intercollegiate Athletics (NAIA), primarily competing in the Kansas Collegiate Athletic Conference (KCAC) since the 1958–59 academic year; which they were a member on a previous stint from 1902–03 to December 1928 (of the 1928–29 school year).

== Varsity sports ==
Sterling competes in 16 intercollegiate varsity sports:

Men's sports	Women's sports
Baseball	Basketball
Basketball	Cross country
Cross country	Golf
Football	Softball
Soccer	Swimming
Swimming	Tennis
Tennis	Track and field^{1}
Track and field^{1}	Volleyball
^{1} – includes both indoor and outdoor

=== Football ===
Reggie Langford is the program's current head coach. Notable former athletes include actor Clarence Gilyard.

During the 1905 season, the Coleman Company set up temporary gas-powered lighting for a night game against Fairmount College (now called Wichita State University). It was the first night football game played west of the Mississippi River. Fairmount won the game 24–0.

In 2013 the Warriors, led by Andy Lambert, went 8–1 in Conference play, winning their first ever Kansas Collegiate Athletic Conference football title. That season also marks the first time qualifying for the NAIA football playoffs. The Warriors lost to Baker University, 10-7. The Warriors also fell to Baker in their second trip to the NAIA football playoffs, a 44-21 loss in 2016.

Sterling Football Playoff History
Year	Opponent	Result
2013	Baker	L, 10-7
2016	Baker	L, 44-21
2017	Morningside	L, 63-7

== Facilities ==
Venue	Sport(s)	Ref.
Smisor Stadium	Football	
Gleason Center	Basketball; Volleyball; Swimming	
SC Baseball	Baseball	
SC Soccer	Soccer	
SC Courts	Tennis	
