= Sterling, Kansas =

City in Rice County, Kansas

- City
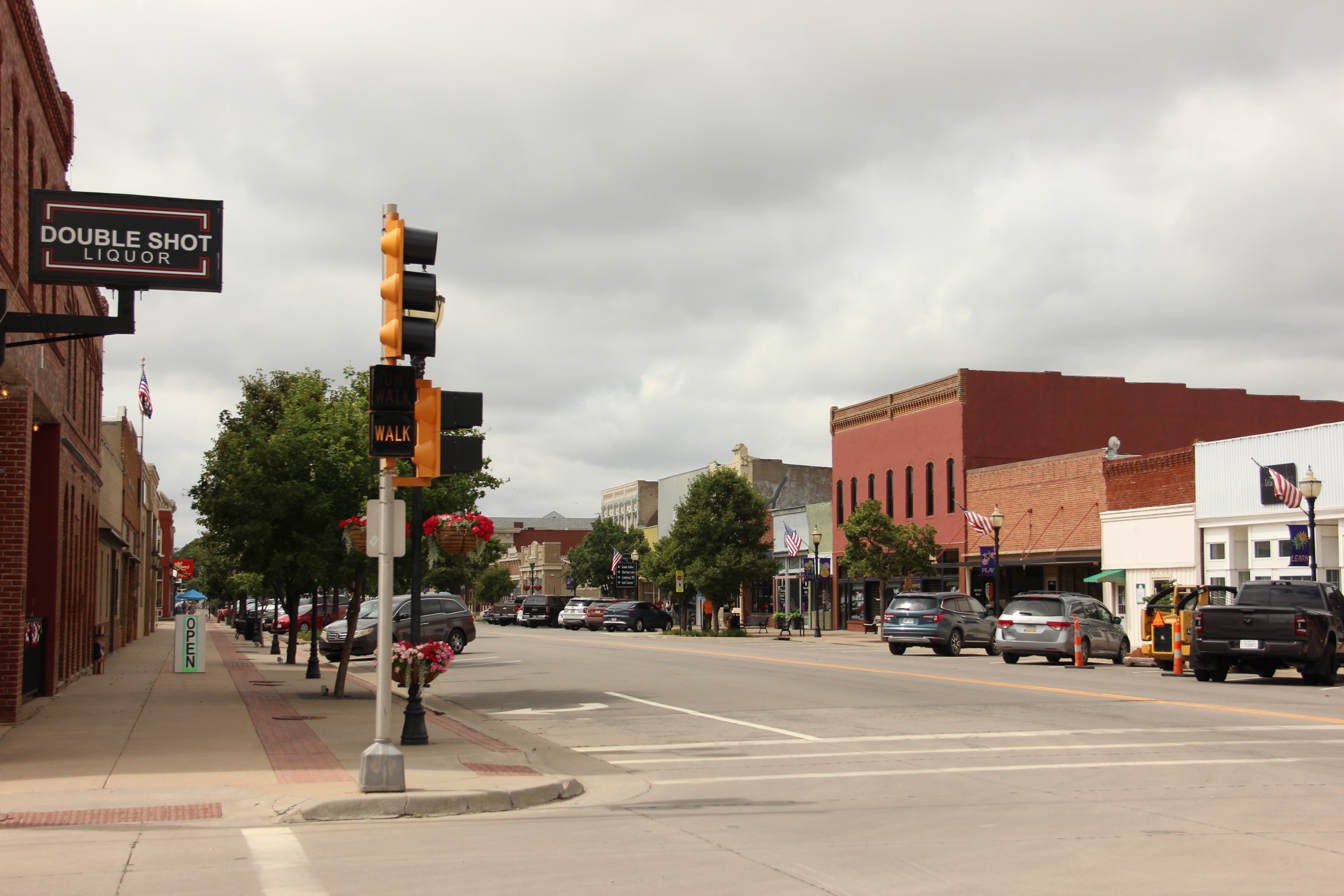
- Downtown Sterling in 2025

- Location within Rice County and Kansas

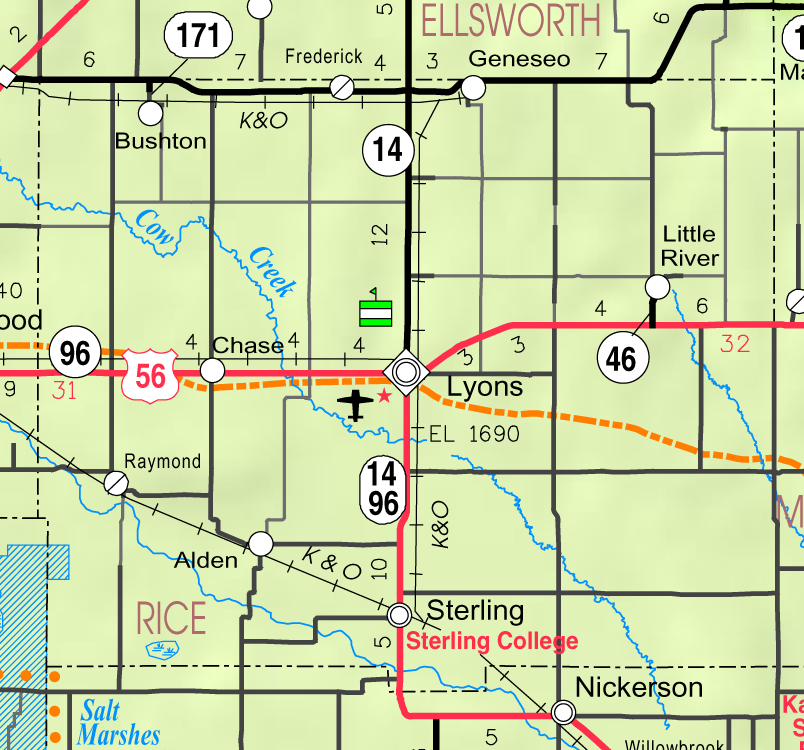
- KDOT map of Rice County (legend)
- Coordinates: 38°12′34″N 98°12′23″W
- Country: United States
- State: Kansas
- County: Rice
- Township: Sterling
- Founded: 1872 (Peace)
- Incorporated: 1876
- Named for: Sterling Rosan

Government
  - Type: Commission-Manager
  - Mayor: Brian Inwood
  - City Manager: Ian Hutcheson

Area
  - Total: 1.83 sq mi (4.75 km^{2})
  - Land: 1.79 sq mi (4.64 km^{2})
  - Water: 0.042 sq mi (0.11 km^{2})
- Elevation: 1,641 ft (500 m)

Population (2020)
  - Total: 2,248
  - Density: 1,250/sq mi (484/km^{2})
- Time zone: UTC-6 (CST)
  - Summer (DST): UTC-5 (CDT)
- ZIP Code: 67579
- Area code: 620
- FIPS code: 20-68200
- GNIS ID: 485654
- Website: sterling-kansas.com

Sterling is a city in Rice County, Kansas, United States. As of the 2020 census, the population of the city was 2,248. Sterling is home to Sterling College.

== History ==
For millennia, the land and future state known as Kansas was inhabited by Native Americans. In 1803, most of modern Kansas was secured by the United States as part of the Louisiana Purchase. In 1854, the Kansas Territory was organized, then in 1861 Kansas became the 34th U.S. state. In 1867, Rice County was founded.

Sterling was founded in 1872, originally called Peace for Mr. Ninde, a Quaker. In 1876, the name was changed to Sterling, by two brothers after their father Sterling Rosan.

In the 1890s, Jonathan S. Dillon sold groceries at his general store in Sterling. Later in 1913, he opened his first J.S. Dillon Cash Food Market in Hutchinson. Later he expanded into the Dillons grocery supermarket chain.

In the 1970s, Sterling was considered a national "Broomcorn Capital."

=== Historic places ===
- Cooper Hall (NRHP), North Broadway Avenue
- Shay Building (NRHP), 202 South Broadway Avenue
- Sterling Carnegie Library (NRHP), 132 North Broadway Avenue

== Geography ==
According to the United States Census Bureau, the city has a total area of 1.71 square miles (4.43 km^{2}), of which 1.67 square miles (4.33 km^{2}) is land and 0.04 square miles (0.10 km^{2}) is water.

=== Climate ===
Climate data for Sterling, Kansas (1991–2020)
Month	Jan	Feb	Mar	Apr	May	Jun	Jul	Aug	Sep	Oct	Nov	Dec	Year
Mean daily maximum °F (°C)	41.9 (5.5)	46.1 (7.8)	56.8 (13.8)	66.6 (19.2)	76.5 (24.7)	87.6 (30.9)	92.5 (33.6)	90.2 (32.3)	82.2 (27.9)	69.6 (20.9)	55.6 (13.1)	43.7 (6.5)	67.4 (19.7)
Daily mean °F (°C)	30.7 (−0.7)	34.3 (1.3)	44.1 (6.7)	53.8 (12.1)	64.9 (18.3)	75.7 (24.3)	80.6 (27.0)	78.4 (25.8)	70.0 (21.1)	56.7 (13.7)	43.4 (6.3)	33.0 (0.6)	55.5 (13.0)
Mean daily minimum °F (°C)	19.5 (−6.9)	22.4 (−5.3)	31.3 (−0.4)	40.9 (4.9)	53.3 (11.8)	63.9 (17.7)	68.7 (20.4)	66.5 (19.2)	57.7 (14.3)	43.9 (6.6)	31.2 (−0.4)	22.2 (−5.4)	43.5 (6.4)
Average precipitation inches (mm)	0.83 (21)	0.95 (24)	1.97 (50)	2.40 (61)	4.71 (120)	4.07 (103)	3.73 (95)	3.77 (96)	2.00 (51)	2.50 (64)	1.05 (27)	1.02 (26)	29 (738)
Average snowfall inches (cm)	3.3 (8.4)	2.6 (6.6)	0.7 (1.8)	0.2 (0.51)	0.0 (0.0)	0.0 (0.0)	0.0 (0.0)	0.0 (0.0)	0.0 (0.0)	0.1 (0.25)	0.6 (1.5)	1.8 (4.6)	9.3 (23.66)
Source: NOAA

== Demographics ==
Historical population
Census	Pop.	Note	%±
1880	1,014		—
1890	1,641		61.8%
1900	2,002		22.0%
1910	2,133		6.5%
1920	2,060		−3.4%
1930	1,868		−9.3%
1940	2,215		18.6%
1950	2,243		1.3%
1960	2,303		2.7%
1970	2,312		0.4%
1980	2,312		0.0%
1990	2,536		9.7%
2000	2,642		4.2%
2010	2,328		−11.9%
2020	2,248		−3.4%
U.S. Decennial Census

=== 2020 census ===
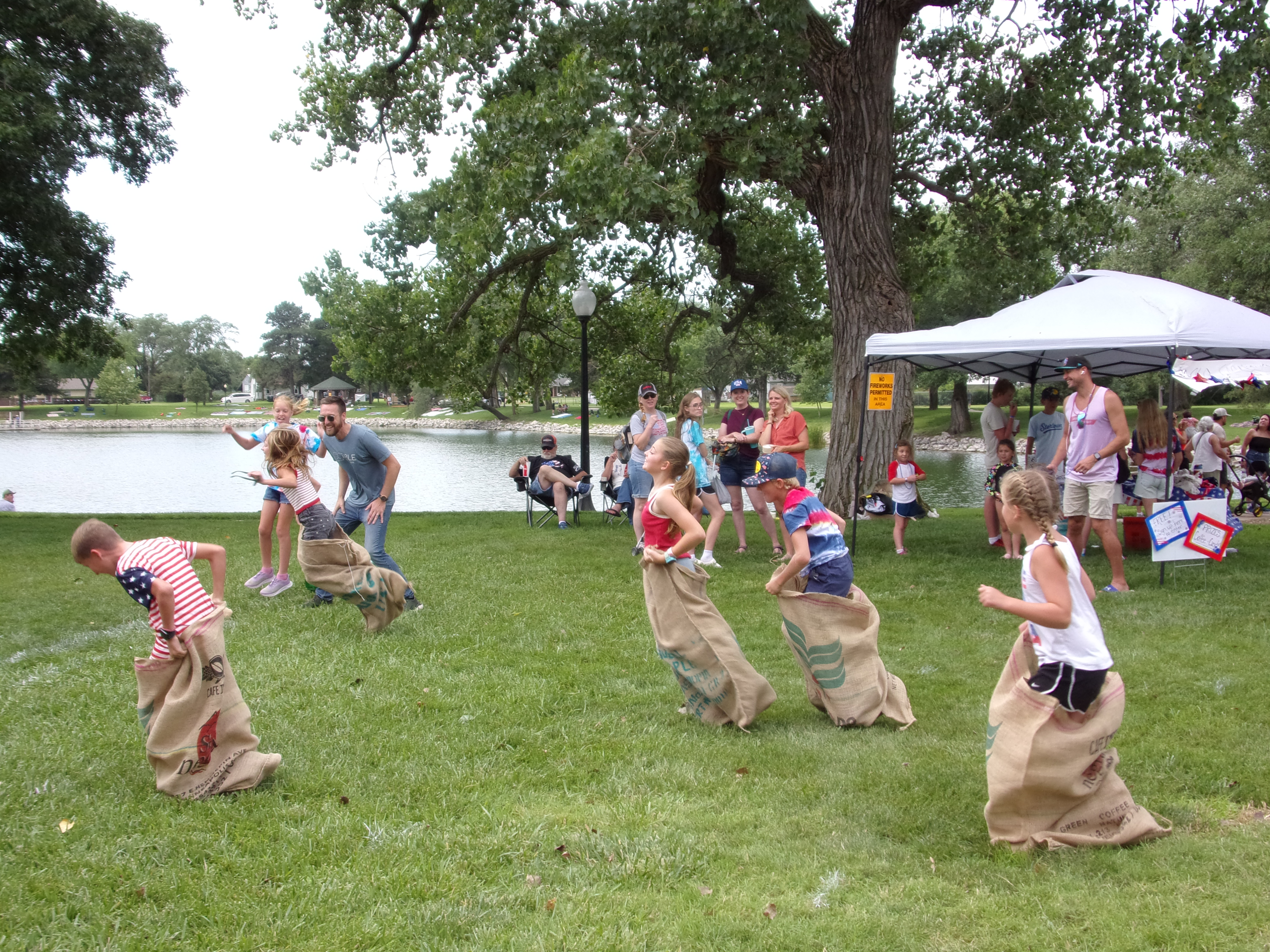
Potato sack race in Sterling for the Semiquincentennial

As of the 2020 census, Sterling had a population of 2,248. The median age was 32.6 years. 20.2% of residents were under the age of 18 and 17.7% of residents were 65 years of age or older. For every 100 females there were 100.5 males, and for every 100 females age 18 and over there were 98.6 males age 18 and over.

0.0% of residents lived in urban areas, while 100.0% lived in rural areas.

There were 814 households in Sterling, of which 28.4% had children under the age of 18 living in them. Of all households, 47.7% were married-couple households, 18.9% were households with a male householder and no spouse or partner present, and 28.4% were households with a female householder and no spouse or partner present. About 33.7% of all households were made up of individuals and 15.6% had someone living alone who was 65 years of age or older.

There were 942 housing units, of which 13.6% were vacant. The homeowner vacancy rate was 1.8% and the rental vacancy rate was 12.3%.

Racial composition as of the 2020 census
Race	Number	Percent
White	1,943	86.4%
Black or African American	87	3.9%
American Indian and Alaska Native	12	0.5%
Asian	15	0.7%
Native Hawaiian and Other Pacific Islander	0	0.0%
Some other race	84	3.7%
Two or more races	107	4.8%
Hispanic or Latino (of any race)	161	7.2%

=== 2010 census ===
As of the census of 2010, there were 2,328 people, 786 households, and 510 families living in the city. The population density was 1,394.0 inhabitants per square mile (538.2/km^{2}). There were 933 housing units at an average density of 558.7 per square mile (215.7/km^{2}). The racial makeup of the city was 93.1% White, 2.4% African American, 0.7% Native American, 0.6% Asian, 0.9% from other races, and 2.3% from two or more races. Hispanic or Latino of any race were 4.3% of the population.

There were 786 households, of which 27.9% had children under the age of 18 living with them, 52.7% were married couples living together, 8.9% had a female householder with no husband present, 3.3% had a male householder with no wife present, and 35.1% were non-families. 30.2% of all households were made up of individuals, and 14.8% had someone living alone who was 65 years of age or older. The average household size was 2.31 and the average family size was 2.89.

The median age in the city was 29.5 years. 18.9% of residents were under the age of 18; 26.9% were between the ages of 18 and 24; 16% were from 25 to 44; 22% were from 45 to 64; and 16.3% were 65 years of age or older. The gender makeup of the city was 50.2% male and 49.8% female.

== Economy ==
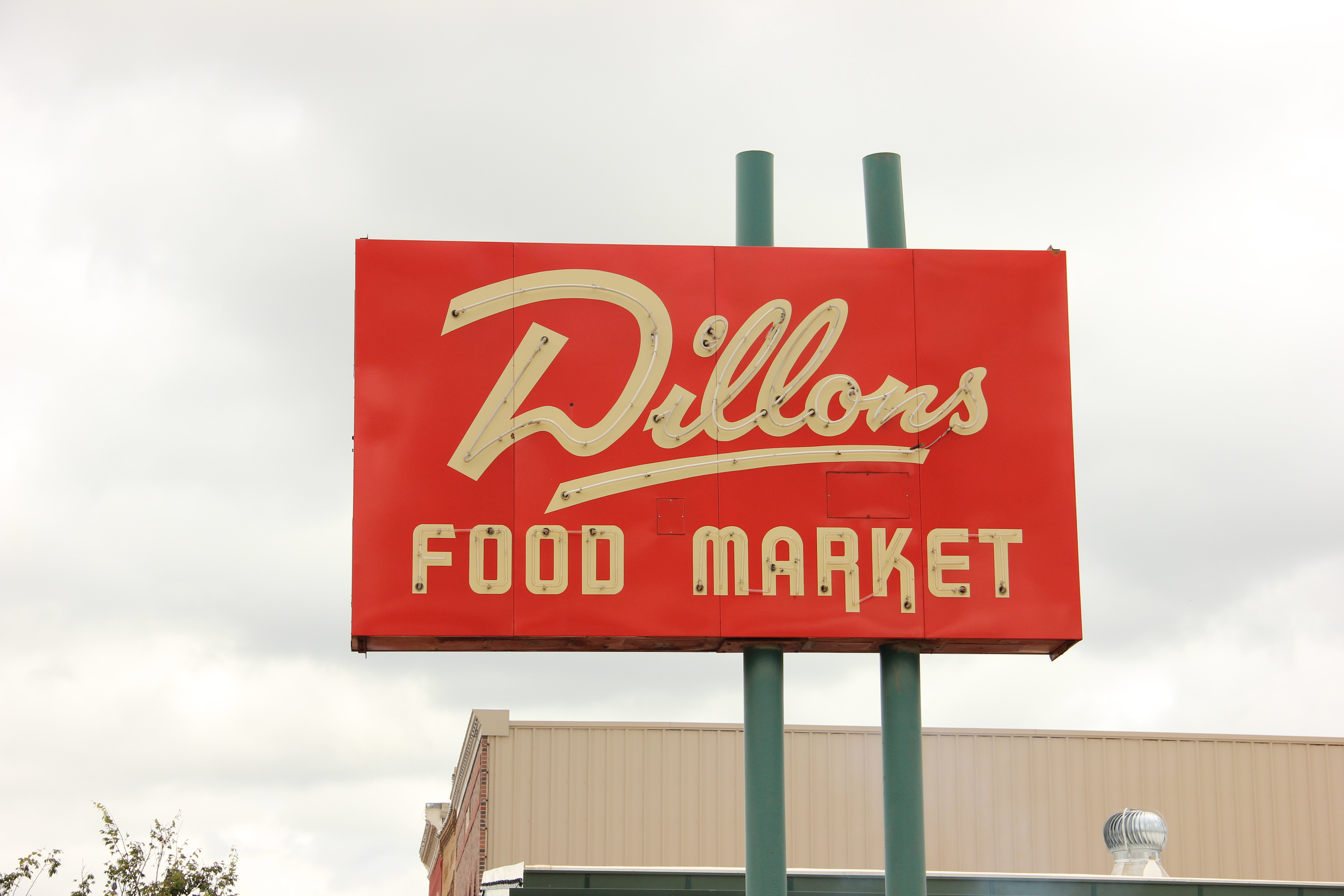
Old neon sign at an operating Dillons in Sterling

Jacam, a chemical manufacturer serving the oil and gas industry, is the largest employer in Sterling.

== Education ==
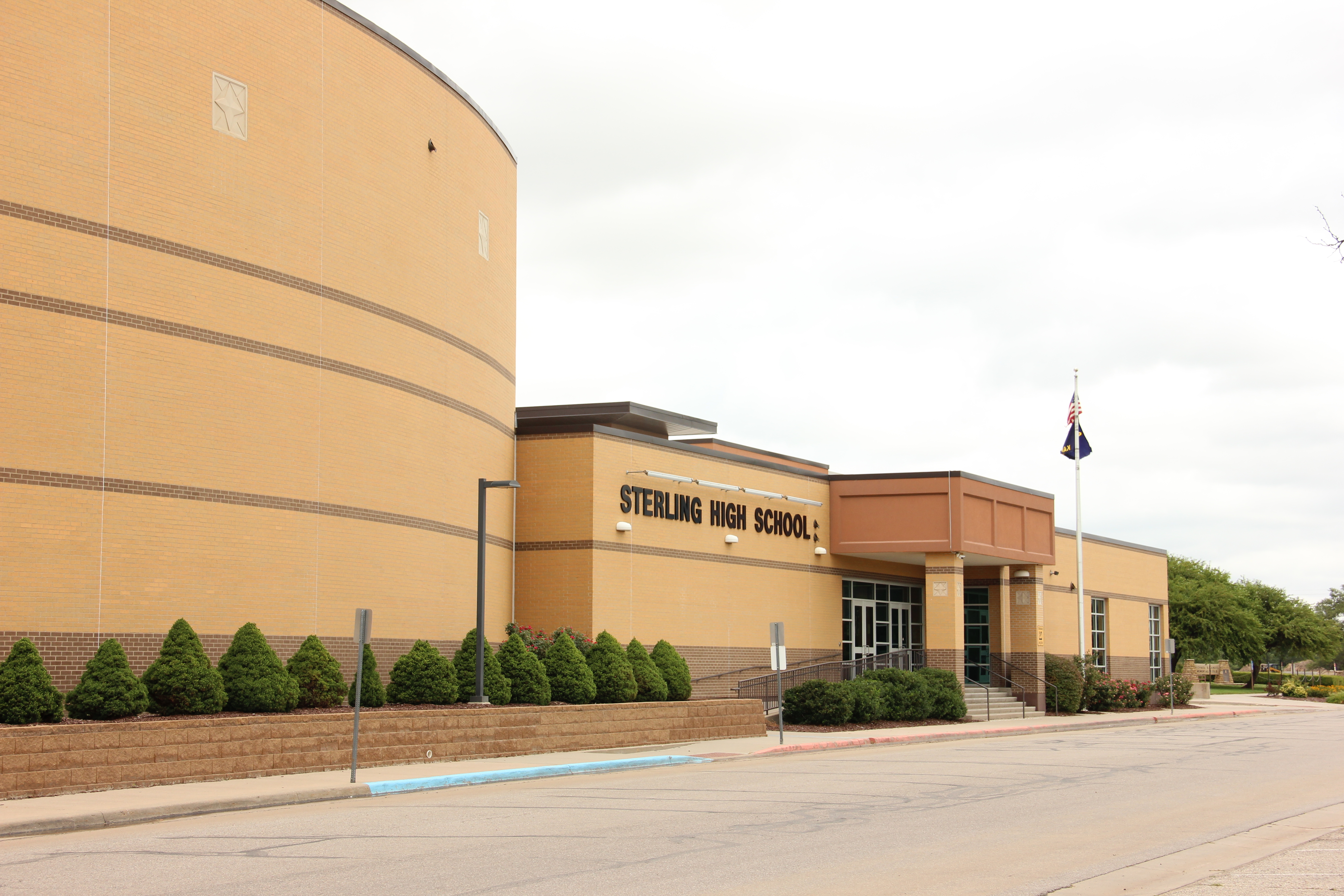
Sterling High School in Sterling

=== Primary and secondary education ===
The community is served by Sterling USD 376 public school district. The district has three schools in Sterling:

- Sterling High School, 308 East Washington Avenue, Grades 9 to 12.
- Sterling Junior High School, 412 North 5th Street, Grades 7 to 8.
- Sterling Grade School, 218 South 5th Street, Grades K to 6.

=== College ===
Sterling College is a four-year institution formerly affiliated with the Presbyterian Church USA. The college is one of the largest employers in the city of Sterling. The Sterling Warriors play home football games at Smisor Stadium and their home basketball games in the Clair L. Gleason PE Center on the Lonnie Kruse Court.

== Infrastructure ==
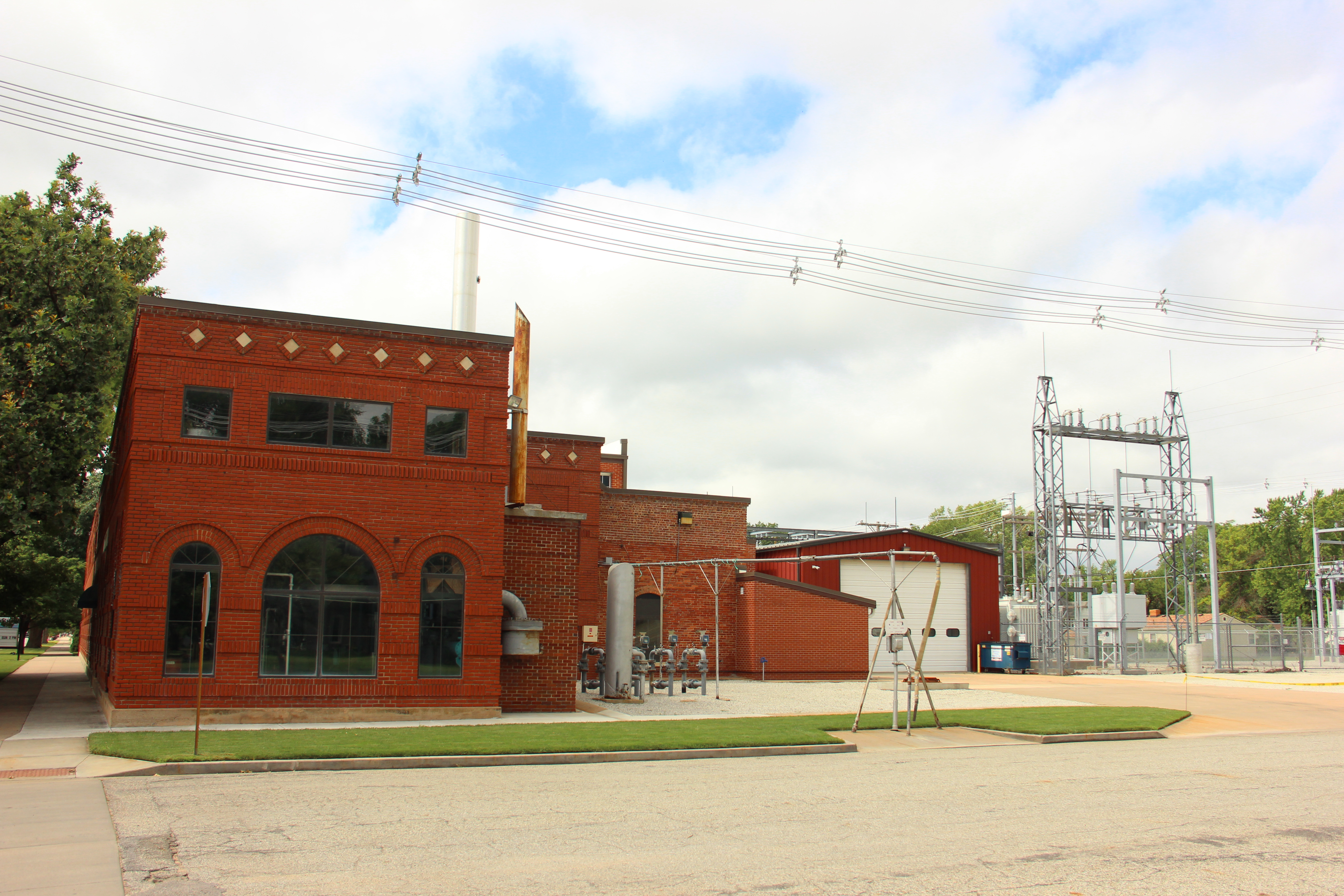
Power and Water Plant of Sterling

=== Transportation ===
==== Highway ====
K-14/K-96 runs along the north side of Sterling, with access to Broadway Ave via a diamond interchange.

The highway previously passed through Sterling on Broadway Ave. In June 2023, the highway was realigned to the limited-access highway that bypasses the city. Initially constructed as a super two freeway, right-of-way has been secured to enable future expansion to four lanes.

==== Rail ====
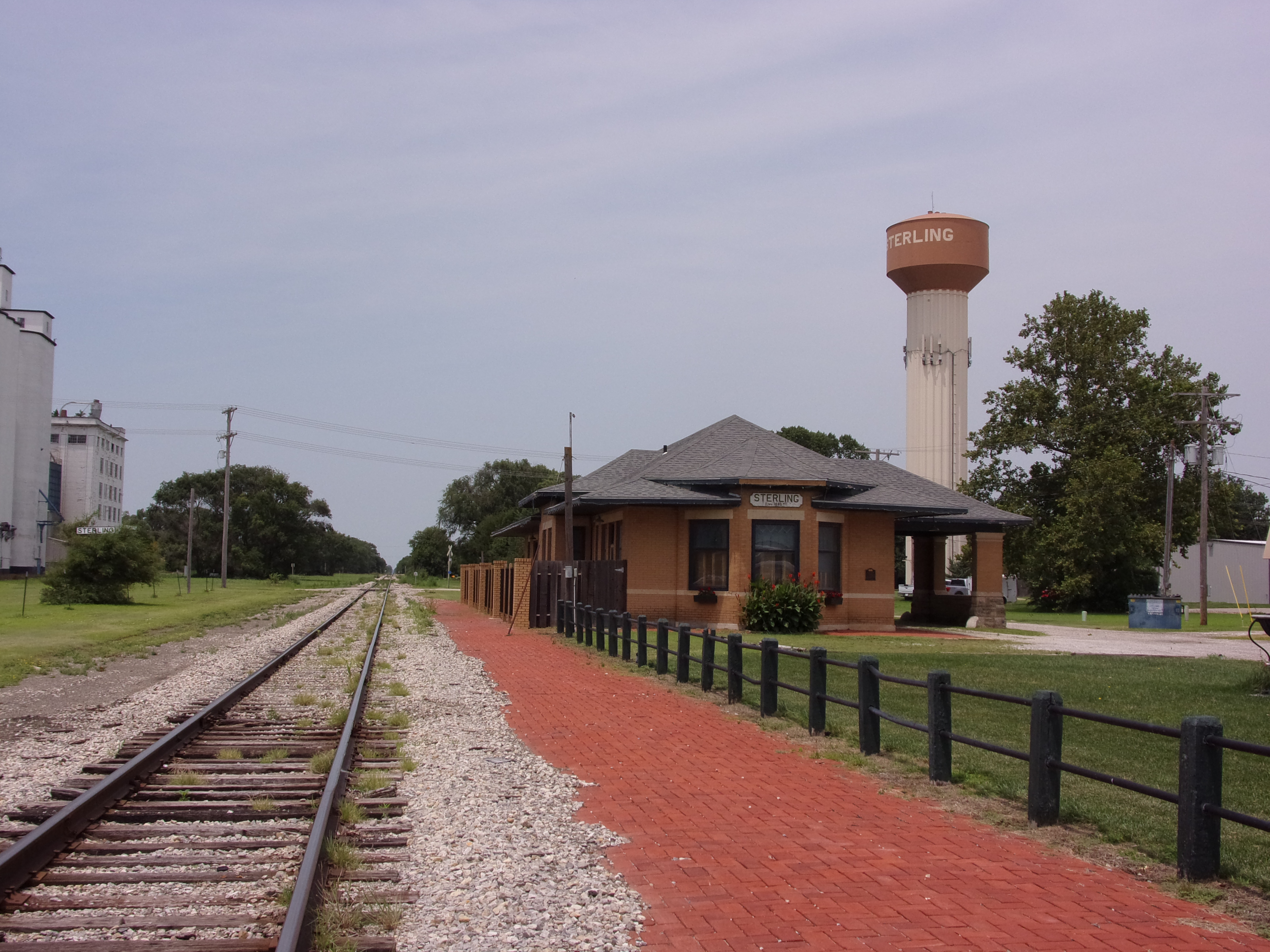
Old train depot

The first train arrived in Sterling on June 26, 1872. The Kansas and Oklahoma Railroad passes through the city as of 2025. The former Atchison, Topeka and Santa Fe Railway depot serves as a law office. It was built in 1903 by R.B. Allington and served passengers until 1965.

==== Utilities ====
Electricity in Sterling is publicly owned and operated.

== Notable people ==
- Doris Fleeson, syndicated journalist, born in Sterling
- Nicolle Galyon, songwriter/singer, won AMC and CMA, raised in Sterling
- Lorene Harrison, musician, educator, born in Sterling
- Martin Pence, United States District Court judge, born in Sterling
- Richard G. Weede, United States Marine Corps General, born in Sterling

== See also ==
- National Register of Historic Places listings in Rice County, Kansas
- Main Street Programs in the United States
