= Sterling College (Kansas) =

Evangelical Christian college in Sterling, Kansas, US

Coordinates: 38°13′12″N 98°12′28″W

- Former name: Cooper Memorial College (1887–1920)
- Type: Private college
- Established: 1869 (157 years ago)
- Accreditation: HLC
- Religious affiliation: Evangelical Christianity
- Academic affiliations: Associated Colleges of Central Kansas; Council for Christian Colleges and Universities
- Endowment: $13.7 million (2025)
- President: Scott Rich
- Faculty: 52
- Students: 680 (2023)
- Location: Sterling, Kansas, U.S.
- Campus: 40 acres (16 ha); Rural
- Colors: Navy, cardinal and silver
- Nickname: Warriors
- Sporting affiliations: NAIA – KCAC
- Website: sterling.edu

Sterling College is a private evangelical Christian college in Sterling, Kansas, United States. It enrolled 680 students in 2023 and is accredited by the Higher Learning Commission.

== History ==
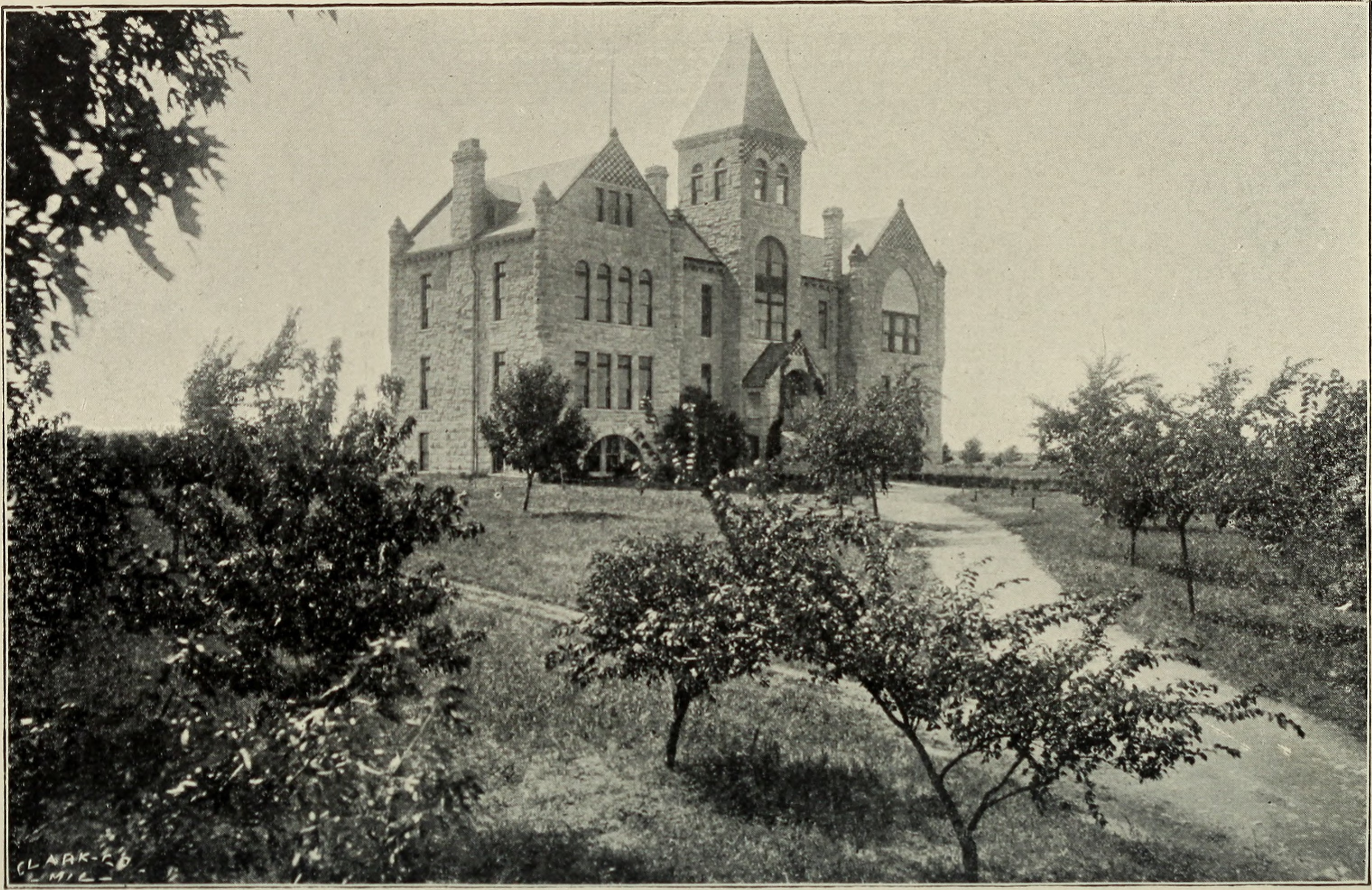
Cooper Memorial College (1898)

The college was founded in 1887 by the Synod of Kansas of the United Presbyterian Church of North America as Cooper Memorial College.

It changed its name to "Sterling" in 1920. When the Presbyterian Church (USA) came into existence in 1958, the newly formed Presbyterian Synod of Kansas considered combining Sterling and the College of Emporia.

== Campus ==
The 1887 Cooper Hall building is a centerpiece of the campus. It was added to the National Register of Historic Places in 1974 (NRHP# 74000845). Cooper Hall underwent a large renovation and after being closed, was reopened in 2003. The campus is 40 acres.

== Athletics ==
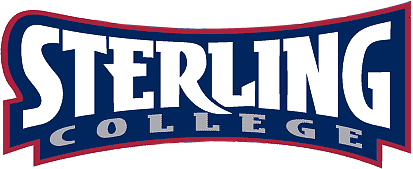
Sterling athletics wordmark

The Sterling athletic teams are called the Warriors. The college is a member of the National Association of Intercollegiate Athletics (NAIA), primarily competing in the Kansas Collegiate Athletic Conference (KCAC) since the 1958–1959 academic year; which they were a member on a previous stint from 1902–1903 to December 1928 (of the 1928–1929 school year). They are also a member of the National Christian College Athletic Association (NCCAA), primarily competing as an independent in the Central Region of the Division I level.

Sterling competes in 23 intercollegiate varsity sports: Men's sports include baseball, basketball, cross country, football, golf, powerlifting, soccer, swimming, tennis and track & field (indoor and outdoor); while women's sports include basketball, cross country, golf, powerlifting, soccer, softball, swimming, tennis, track & field (indoor and outdoor) and volleyball; and co-ed sports include cheerleading.

== Notable people ==
=== Alumni ===
- Clarence Gilyard, actor
- Brett Fairchild, member of the Kansas House of Representatives
- David Hahn, Nebraska politician
- Lorene Harrison, musician, educator
- Waldo McBurney, centenarian (transferred to Kansas State University after two years)
- Windell Middlebrooks, actor
- Joshua Svaty, Kansas politician

=== Faculty ===
- Stephen Carls, taught at Sterling College for twelve years
