= List of McPherson Bulldogs head football coaches =

The McPherson Bulldogs football program is a college football team that represents McPherson College in the Kansas Collegiate Athletic Conference, a part of the NAIA. The team has had 30 head coaches since its first recorded football game in 1920.

Pete Sterbick began with the program starting the 2012 season and resigned at the end of the 2013 season. On December 5, 2013, McPherson announced that defensive coordinator Steve Fox was promoted to head coach. Fox resigned after one season to take a position as assistant coach at Cisco College where he can be near his family.

In December 2014, McPherson hired Paul Mierkiewicz as the 30th head coach of the program.

== Key ==
Key to symbols in coaches list
General		Overall		Conference		Postseason (Note: Although the first Rose Bowl Game was played in 1902, it has been continuously played since the 1916 game, and is recognized as the oldest bowl game by the NCAA. "—" indicates any season prior to 1916 when postseason games were not played.)	
No.	Order of coaches (Note: A running total of the number of head coaches, with coaches who served separate tenures being counted only once. Interim head coaches are represented with "Int" and are not counted in the running total. "—" indicates the team played but either without a coach or no coach is on record. "X" indicates an interim year without play.)	GC	Games coached	CW	Conference wins	PW	Postseason wins
DC	Division championships	OW	Overall wins	CL	Conference losses	PL	Postseason losses
CC	Conference championships	OL	Overall losses	CT	Conference ties	PT	Postseason ties
NC	National championships	OT	Overall ties (Note: Overtime rules in college football were introduced in 1996, making ties impossible in the period since.)	C%	Conference winning percentage		
†	Elected to the College Football Hall of Fame	O%	Overall winning percentage (Note: When computing the win–loss percentage, a tie counts as half a win and half a loss.)				

== Coaches ==
School records of the program go back to 1920, but other records show a player named Pop Hollinger played football for McPherson in 1917 or earlier. It is possible that records are incorrect, incomplete, or that there was no official coach before the 1920 season.

No.	Name	Term	GC	OW	OL	OT	O%	CW	CL	CT	C%	PW	PL	CCs	Awards
1	W. E. Daniel	1920	11	5	3	3	.591	—	—	—	—	—	—	—	—
2	Dutch Lonborg	1921–1922	19	10	9	0	.526	7	9	0	.438	—	—	—	—
3	Floyd Mishler	1923–1924	18	10	6	2	.611	10	6	2	.611	—	—	1	—
4	George Gardner	1925–1929	39	10	25	4	.308	6	22	3	.242	—	—	—	—
5	Melvin J. Binford	1930–1935	53	23	26	4	.472	9	13	4	.423	—	—	—	—
6	Lester Selves	1936	9	5	3	1	.611	3	1	1	.700	—	—	—	—
7	W. P. Astle	1937–1939	27	9	15	3	.389	4	10	2	.313	—	—	—	—
8	Thomas C. Hayden	1940–1942, 1946	33	8	22	3	.288	9	11	2	.455	—	—	—	—
X	No team	1943–1945	—	—	—	—	—	—	—	—	—	—	—	—	—
9	Rolla Reiling	1947	7	1	6	0	.143	0	6	0	.000	—	—	—	—
10	F. M. Hardacre	1948–1949	17	1	16	0	.059	0	12	0	.000	—	—	—	—
11	Woody Woodard	1950–1952	26	18	7	1	.712	13	5	0	.722	—	—	1	—
12	Sid Smith	1953–1966, 1971–1972	145	62	82	1	.431	56	71	1	.441	—	—	—	—
13	Dwight McSpadden	1967–1968	18	2	16	0	.111	2	16	0	.111	—	—	—	—
14	William Knuckles	1969–1970	17	1	16	0	.059	1	15	0	.063	—	—	—	—
15	Don Rominger	1973–1977	47	11	35	1	.245	7	16	1	.313	—	—	—	—
16	John Gragg	1978	9	5	4	0	.556	5	3	0	.625	—	—	—	—
17	Lou Serrone	1979	9	3	6	0	.333	3	5	0	.375	—	—	—	—
18	Lee Dobyns	1980	9	2	7	0	.222	5	11	0	.313	—	—	—	—
19	Dave Cripe	1981–1983	27	4	22	1	.167	4	22	1	.167	—	—	—	—
20	Steve Phipps	1984–1985	18	2	16	0	.111	2	16	0	.111	—	—	—	—
21	Dan Thiessen	1986–1992	65	21	44	0	.323	19	43	0	.306	—	—	—	—
22	Bruce Grose	1993–1997	48	16	32	0	.333	13	27	0	.325	—	—	—	—
23	Steve Kazor	1998–1999	20	12	8	0	.600	9	7	0	.563	—	—	—	—
24	Dan Davis	2000–2001	19	4	15	0	.211	3	15	0	.167	—	—	—	—
25	David Cunningham	2002–2006	50	24	26	0	.480	21	24	0	.467	—	—	—	—
26	Brian Ward	2007–2009	31	17	14	0	.548	14	13	0	.519	—	1	—	—
27	Joe Bettasso	2010–2011	22	14	8	0	.636	13	5	0	.722	—	1	1	—
28	Pete Sterbick	2012–2013	20	9	11	0	.450	8	9	0	.471	—	–	–	—
29	Steve Fox	2014	11	4	7	—	.364	4	5	—	.444	—	—	—	—
30	Paul Mierkiewicz	2015–2018	41	7	34	—	.171	6	31	—	.162	—	—	—	—
31	Jeremiah Fiscus	2019–	27	14	13	—	.519	14	13	—	.519	—	—	—	—

== See also ==
- List of people from McPherson County, Kansas
