= Groseclose =

Groseclose may refer to:

== Surnames ==
- Elgin Groseclose, American economist
- Timothy Groseclose, American political scientist and economist
- Henry C. Groseclose, American professor and founder, National FFA Organization

== Places ==
- Groseclose, Smyth County, Virginia, United States
