= The Kentucky FFA Association =

The Kentucky FFA Association is a student-led organization centered around agricultural education and career development. Serving as Kentucky's Chapter of the National FFA Organization, the primary goal is to follow the wider organizations stated mission.

The Kentucky FFA Association is currently led by a team of 12 State FFA Officers representing all 12 regions of The Kentucky FFA Association—a President, Vice President, Secretary, Treasurer, Reporter, Sentinel, and six Regional Vice Presidents. The Kentucky FFA Association is home to 144 high school chapters and 12 middle school chapters as of the year 2017.

== History ==
The Kentucky FFA Association was founded on April 16, 1930, at The Brown Hotel in Louisville, Kentucky. In 1937, the Kentucky FFA Leadership Training Center was founded in Hardinsburg, Kentucky; where the Kentucky FFA Association archives are located and it still remains the location of Kentucky FFA Camp today. In 1957, Howard Downing (of Jessamine County) became the first National FFA President from Kentucky. Kenneth Kennedy (of Trigg County) became the next National FFA president from Kentucky in 1964. In 1977, 12 years after the New Farmers of America and the Future Farmers of America merged to create one organization, The Kentucky FFA Association had its first African American state president Steve Washington (of Adairville). In 1979, Pam Brinkley was elected the first female State FFA Officer in Kentucky. In 1984, Kentucky had its third National FFA President Steve Merideth (of Hardin County). In 1987, The Kentucky FFA Foundation, which raises and manages funds for the organization, was formed. In 1989, 20 years after females were allowed to join the FFA Organization, Susan Smitson (of Jessamine County) was the first female Kentucky FFA State President. In 2012, Joenelle Futrell (of Daviess County) was elected as the first female National FFA Officer from Kentucky.

== Events ==
There are few events put on at the state level each year by the Kentucky FFA Association. These include the Annual Kentucky FFA State Convention (held at Rupp Arena each June in Lexington, Kentucky), Kentucky FFA Camp (which runs five weeks out of the summer and is held at the Kentucky FFA Leadership Training Center in Hardinsburg, Kentucky), The Rising Sun Conference (held in July at the Kentucky FFA Leadership Training Center in Hardinsburg, Kentucky), and the Blue and Gold Gala (held in various locations across Kentucky).

The Annual Kentucky FFA State Convention is where students who have won competitions on the regional level come to compete at the state level. It is also where the State FFA Degree is awarded to members and where the State Stars in Agriculture are named. Each chapter submits forms to be ranked by their accomplishments and work done throughout the school year—chapters can receive a gold, silver, or bronze star ranking. It is also where the new Kentucky FFA State Officer team is interviewed and elected by the Nominating Committee.

Kentucky FFA Camp is where students from every FFA chapter in Kentucky are invited to spend the week learning leadership skills, preparing for the school year ahead, and participating in athletic competitions. During Kentucky FFA Camp, a Camp Council is elected to serve as an Officer Team for the respective week of camp. Camp council is responsible for raising and lowering the American flag each day and for delivering reports during each session. Students can also take classes to learn trade skills (e.g. welding, tractor driving, electrical safety, etc.).

The Rising Sun Conference is open to two officers from every chapter of the Kentucky FFA Association and serves as a way to unify beliefs and share ideas across the state of Kentucky. The members spend a weekend with counterparts from across the state comparing programs of activities and ideas to incorporate into their chapters. The conference also serves as a time where the Kentucky FFA State Officer team can express their goals for the coming year and challenge the officers at the chapter level to help carry them out.

The Blue and Gold Gala is hosted by the Kentucky FFA Foundation and serves as a fundraiser for the organization. Anyone is invited to event where funds are raised through ticket sales, donations, silent auction items, and live auction items.

== Leadership ==
The Kentucky FFA Association is currently led by a team of 12 Kentucky FFA State Officers which are high school graduates who are selected through an interview process at the regional and then state level. The team is supported by four full-time staff members: an Executive Secretary (currently Matt Chaliff), a State Advisor (currently Kristen Wright), a Foundation Director (currently Ms. Sheldon McKinney), and an FFA Camp Director (currently Josh Mitcham).
