= McSpadden =

McSpadden is a surname. Notable people with the surname include:

- Clem McSpadden (1925–2008), American politician
- Dwight McSpadden (1932–1990), American football coach
- Gary McSpadden (1943–2020), American pastor, singer, songwriter, producer, television host and motivational speaker
- Lara McSpadden (born 1999), Australian women's basketball player
- Lealand McSpadden (born 1946), American racing driver
- Phil McSpadden, American softball coach
- Richard McSpadden (died 2023), American pilot and educator

== See also ==
- Alex McSpadyen (1914–1978), Scottish footballer
- McSpadden Hollow, a valley in the U.S. state of Missouri
