= Mishler =

Mishler is a surname first found in Baden. It is perhaps an occupational surname in origin, being derived from the Middle High German word "Mutze". Notable people with the surname include:

- Floyd Mishler (1892–1973), American football coach and physical education advocate
- Jacob Mishler (1911–2004), American federal judge
- James Mishler (born 1969), American writer and editor
- Jeffrey Allen Mishler (born 1956), known professionally as Jeff Allen, American comedian
- Reese Mishler (born 1991), American actor
- Ryan Mishler (born 1968), American politician

== See also ==
- Mishler, Ohio
- Mishler Theatre
