= Dobyns =

Dobyns is a surname. Notable people with the surname include:

- Emery Dobyns, American record producer
- Henry F. Dobyns (1925–2009), American anthropologist
- Jay Dobyns (born 1961), American special agent
- John P. Dobyns (1944–2020), American politician
- Lee Dobyns (born c. 1935), American football coach
- Lloyd Dobyns (1936–2021), American news anchor
- Stephen Dobyns (born 1941), American poet and novelist
- Winifred Starr Dobyns (1886–1963), American suffragist and landscape designer
