= Dave Cripe (American football) =

American football coach

Biographical details
- Born: September 7, 1951; Dayton, Ohio, U.S.
- Died: June 9, 2010 (aged 58); Middletown, Ohio, U.S.

Coaching career (HC unless noted)
- 1981–1983: McPherson
- 1984–1992: Madison HS (OH)
- 1993–2008: Edgewood HS (OH)

Head coaching record
- Overall: 4–22–1 (college)

David Andrew Cripe (September 7, 1951 – June 9, 2010) was an American football coach. He served as the head football coach at McPherson College in McPherson, Kansas for three seasons, from 1981 to 1983, compiling a record of 4–22–1. Cripe also worked at the high school level as an assistant and head coach at various schools.

== Head coaching record ==
=== College ===
Year	Team	Overall	Conference	Standing	Bowl/playoffs
McPherson Bulldogs (Kansas Collegiate Athletic Conference) (1981–1983)
1981	McPherson	2–7	2–6	8th	
1982	McPherson	0–9	0–9	10th	
1983	McPherson	2–6–1	2–6–1	T–8th	
McPherson:		4–22–1	4–21–1		
Total:		4–22–1			
