= George Keim =

George Keim may refer to:

- George May Keim (1805–1861), U.S. Representative from Pennsylvania
- George Keim (American football), American football coach
