= Lou Serrone =

American football coach

Coaching career (HC unless noted)
- 1979: McPherson

Head coaching record
- Overall: 3–6

Lou Serrone is an American former football coach. He was the head football coach at McPherson College in McPherson, Kansas, serving for one season, in 1979, and compiling a record of 3–6.

== Head coaching record ==
Year	Team	Overall	Conference	Standing	Bowl/playoffs
McPherson Bulldogs (Kansas Collegiate Athletic Conference) (1979)
1979	McPherson	3–6	3–5	T–5th	
McPherson:		3–6	3–5		
Total:		3–6			
