= Gragg =

Gragg is a surname. Notable people with the surname include:

- Chris Gragg (born 1990), American football player
- Jamie Gragg, American politician
- John Gragg, American football coach
- Scott Gragg (born 1972), American football player
- William B. Gragg, Emeritus Professor in the Department of Applied Mathematics at the Naval Postgraduate School.
