= George Keim (American football) =

American football coach

Playing career
- 1950–1953: McPherson

Coaching career (HC unless noted)
- 1954–1959: McPherson (assistant)
- 1960–1964: Bridgewater

Head coaching record
- Overall: 8–27–1

Accomplishments and honors

Awards
- McPherson Hall of Fame (1991)

George Keim is a retired American football coach. He served as the head coach of Bridgewater College in Bridgewater, Virginia from 1960 to 1964, amassing a record of 8–27–1.

Keim is a 1954 graduate of McPherson College in McPherson, Kansas where he was a co-captain of the 1952 Kansas Collegiate Athletic Conference championship football team.

== Head coaching record ==
Year	Team	Overall	Conference	Standing	Bowl/playoffs
Bridgewater Eagles (Mason–Dixon Conference / Virginia Little Eight Conference) (1960–1964)
1960	Bridgewater	0–7	0–4 / 0–2	T–5th / 4th	
1961	Bridgewater	0–8	0–4 / 0–2	6th / 4th	
1962	Bridgewater	3–3	2–2 / 1–1	3rd / 3rd	
1963	Bridgewater	2–4–1	2–1–1 / 1–1	3rd / 2nd	
1964	Bridgewater	3–5	1–2 / 0–3	4th / 6th	
Bridgewater:		8–27–1	5–14–1		
Total:		8–27–1			
