= Adel, Iowa =

- City
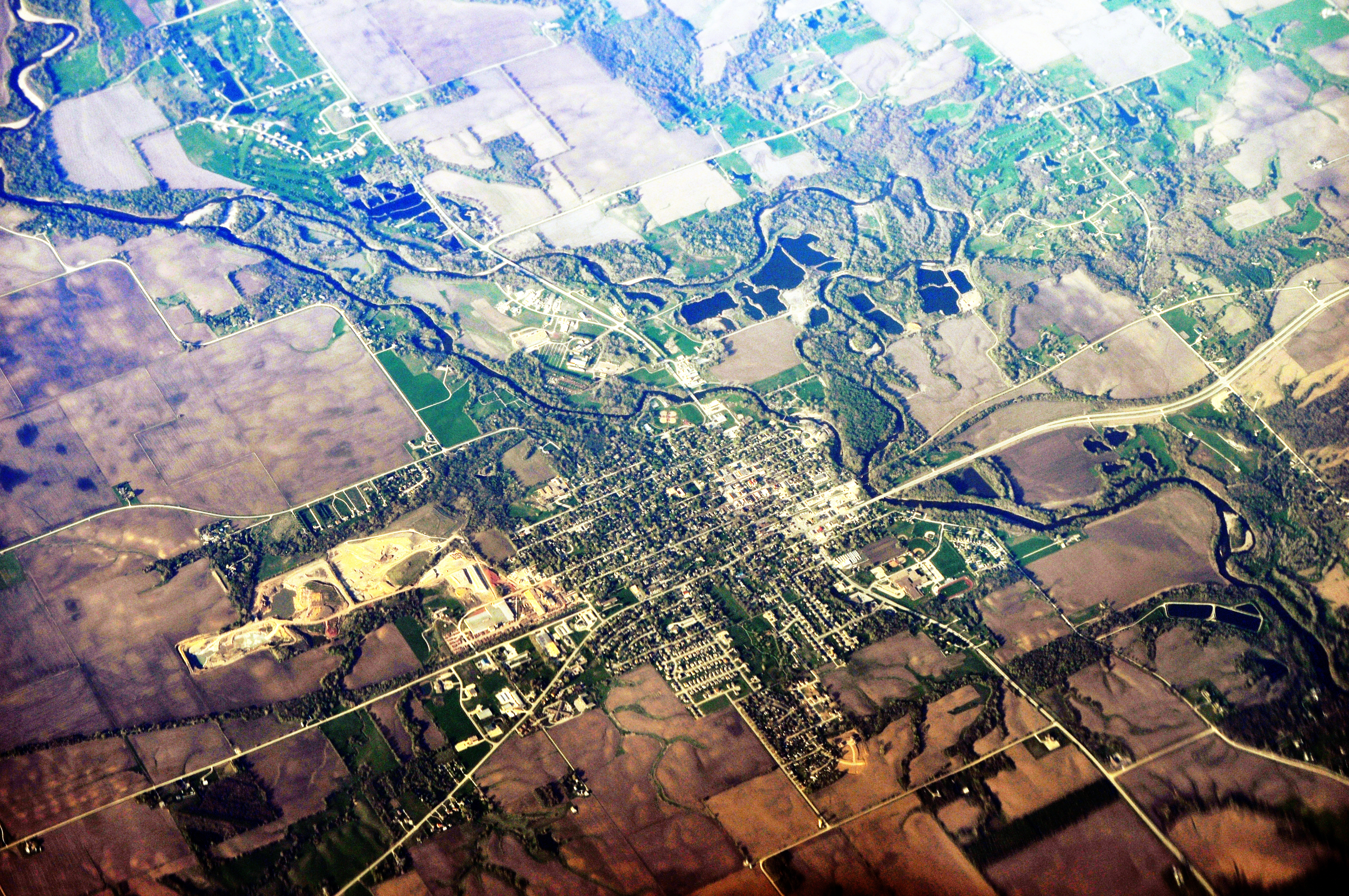
- Aerial view of Adel

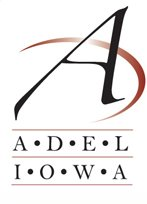
- Seal

- Location of Adel, Iowa

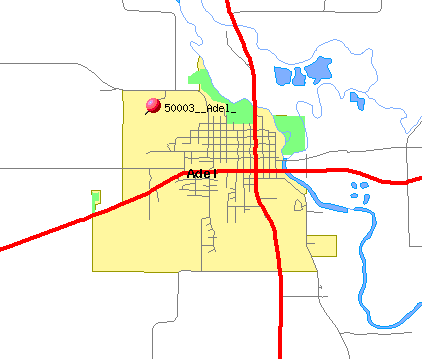
- Detailed map of Adel
- Coordinates: 41°36′36″N 94°00′45″W
- Country: United States
- State: Iowa
- County: Dallas
- Incorporated: 1847

Government
  - Type: Mayor-council government

Area
  - Total: 5.36 sq mi (13.88 km^{2})
  - Land: 5.34 sq mi (13.83 km^{2})
  - Water: 0.019 sq mi (0.05 km^{2})
- Elevation: 892 ft (272 m)

Population (2020)
  - Total: 6,153
  - Density: 1,152/sq mi (444.9/km^{2})
- Time zone: UTC-6 (Central (CST))
  - Summer (DST): UTC-5 (CDT)
- ZIP code: 50003
- Area code: 515
- FIPS code: 19-00505
- GNIS feature ID: 2393882
- Website: www.adeliowa.gov

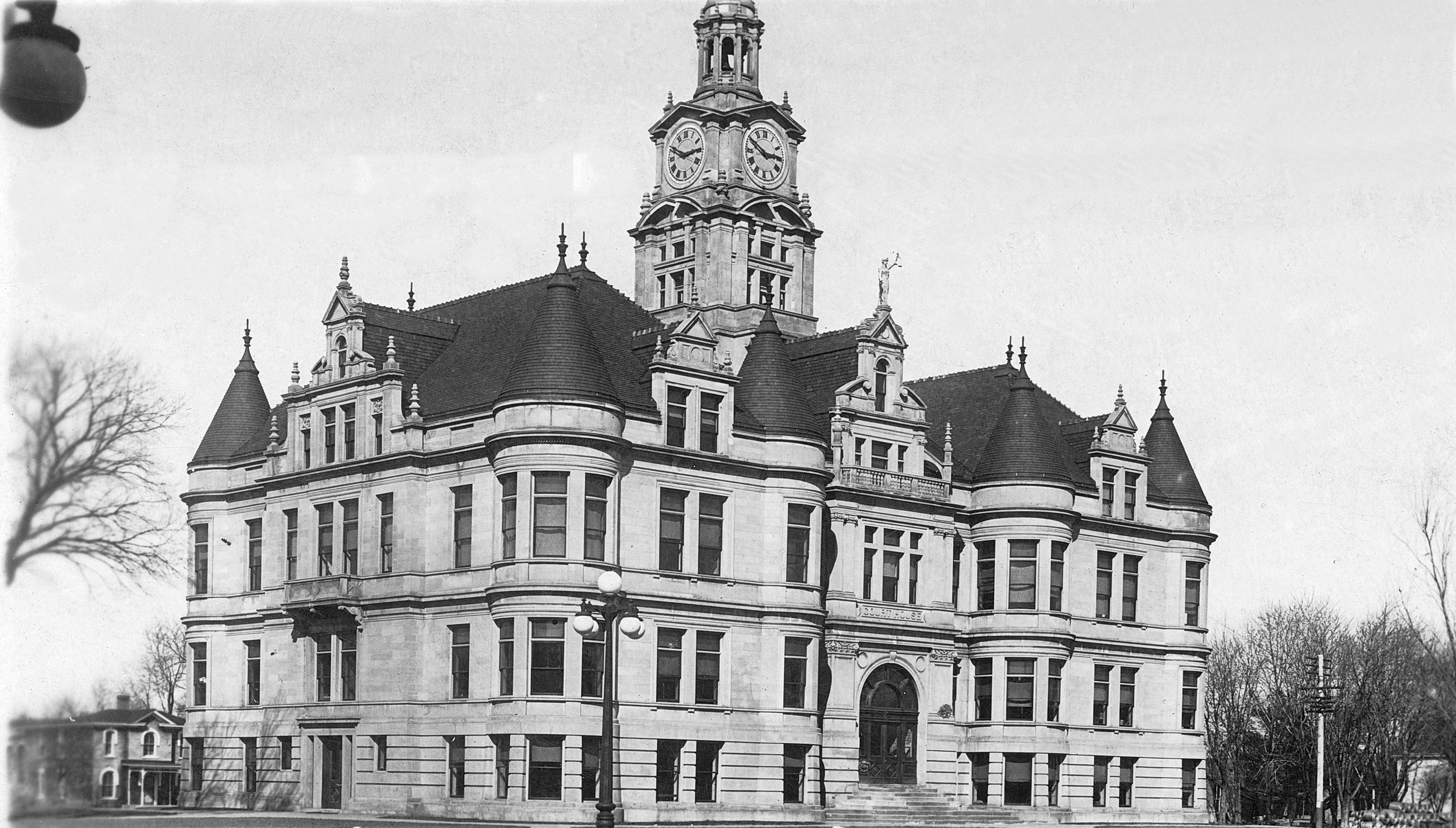
Dallas County courthouse, 1911

Adel (/eɪˈdɜːl/ ay-DEL) is a city in and the county seat of Dallas County, Iowa, United States. It is located along the North Raccoon River. Its population was 6,153 at the time of the 2020 Census.

== History ==
Adel is the oldest town within Dallas County. Originally called Penoach, Adel was incorporated in 1847, and changed to its current name in 1849. In 1855, there were about twenty-five houses in Adel and three stores. From that time onward, the city began to grow at a faster rate.

Situated along the river, Adel had a good supply of water-power for a flour mill. It was to be situated on a section of property owned by Noeingerl Cantrel & Co. J. H. Strong of Des Moines, and H. H. Moffatt built the mill in 1856–57 at a cost of $20,000. The dam was constructed with about eight feet of head water. The mill was kept in good repair, able to average from twelve to fifteen bushels per hour, with a capability of thirty per hour, but was destroyed in 1913.

The railroad reached other towns in Dallas County before Adel, and the town was threatened with losing the county seat. Adel business owners backed the Des Moines Western Railroad Company, which was soon renamed as the Des Moines, Adel, and Western. A narrow gauge railroad was built in the 1870s. The line was rebuilt as standard gauge after the Milwaukee Road purchased the line in the 1890s. Passenger service to Adel was discontinued in 1952, and the line was abandoned in 1987. The line has been repurposed into the popular Raccoon River Valley Trail.

The Adel bank was robbed on March 6, 1895. Two men entered in a buggy and shot a teller, who, though wounded, managed to close the vault and turn the tumblers, preventing the thieves from taking off with a substantial amount. Future Governor of Iowa George W. Clarke had a law office on the second floor. As Clarke descended the stairs, a robber fired his gun. However, the weapon misfired, sparing Clarke's life.

The Dallas County Courthouse, completed in 1902 at a cost of about $109,000, is located at the center of downtown Adel.

Adel was located along the route used by the Mormon handcart pioneers during the 1850s. Beginning in 1856, handcart companies traveling from Iowa City to Council Bluffs passed through Adel on their way west to Salt Lake City. The route roughly followed present-day U.S. Route 6.

== Geography ==
According to the United States Census Bureau, the city has a total area of 3.28 square miles (8.50 km^{2}), of which 3.27 square miles (8.47 km^{2}) is land and 0.01 square miles (0.03 km^{2}) is water.

== Demographics ==
Historical populations
Year	Pop.	±%
1860	466	—
1870	711	+52.6%
1880	989	+39.1%
1890	995	+0.6%
1900	1,213	+21.9%
1910	1,289	+6.3%
1920	1,455	+12.9%
1930	1,669	+14.7%
1940	1,740	+4.3%
1950	1,799	+3.4%
1960	2,060	+14.5%
1970	2,419	+17.4%
1980	2,846	+17.7%
1990	3,304	+16.1%
2000	3,435	+4.0%
2010	3,682	+7.2%
2020	6,153	+67.1%
Source:"U.S. Census website". United States Census Bureau. and Iowa Data Center; Source: U.S. Decennial Census

Adel is part of the Des Moines metropolitan area.

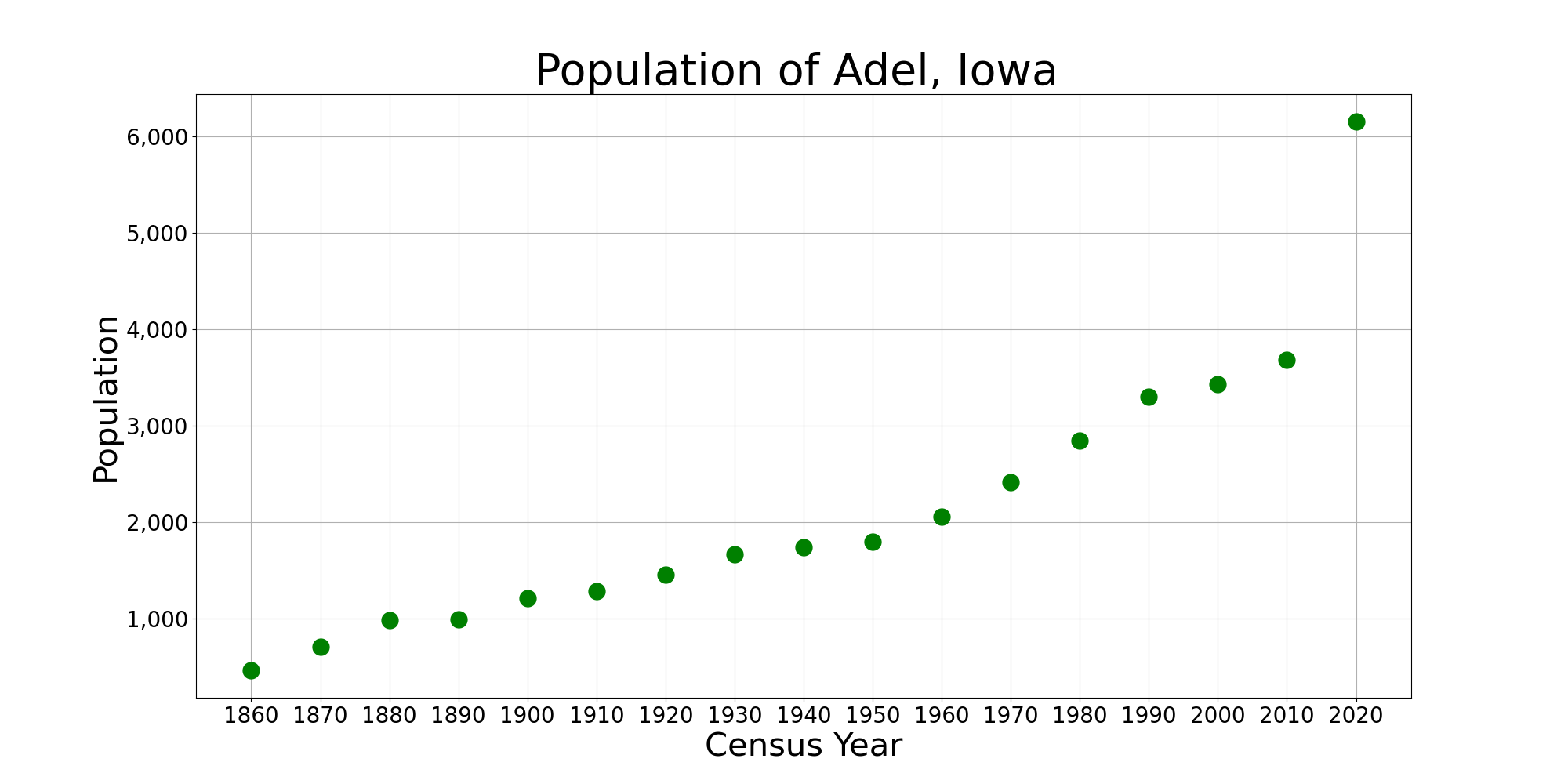
The population of Adel, Iowa from US census data

=== 2020 census ===
As of the 2020 census, there were 6,153 people, 2,288 households, and 1,610 families residing in the city. The population density was 1,152.3 inhabitants per square mile (444.9/km^{2}). There were 2,396 housing units at an average density of 448.7 per square mile (173.2/km^{2}).

The median age was 35.3 years. 30.1% of residents were under the age of 18. For every 100 females there were 99.0 males, and for every 100 females age 18 and over there were 95.5 males age 18 and over. By broader age groups, 32.2% of residents were under the age of 20; 3.5% were between the ages of 20 and 24; 30.6% were from 25 and 44; 21.7% were from 45 and 64; and 12.0% were 65 years of age or older. The gender makeup of the city was 49.7% male and 50.3% female.

92.2% of residents lived in urban areas, while 7.8% lived in rural areas.

Of the 2,288 households, 41.4% had children under the age of 18 living with them, 56.9% were married-couple households, 7.1% were cohabitating couples, 20.9% had a female householder with no spouse or partner present, and 15.1% had a male householder with no spouse or partner present. 29.6% of all households were non-families. About 24.2% of all households were made up of individuals, and 10.5% had someone living alone who was 65 years of age or older.

Of the 2,396 housing units, 4.5% were vacant. The homeowner vacancy rate was 1.1% and the rental vacancy rate was 8.2%.

Racial composition as of the 2020 census
Race	Number	Percent
White	5,746	93.4%
Black or African American	48	0.8%
American Indian and Alaska Native	14	0.2%
Asian	28	0.5%
Native Hawaiian and Other Pacific Islander	0	0.0%
Some other race	42	0.7%
Two or more races	275	4.5%
Hispanic or Latino (of any race)	172	2.8%

=== 2010 census ===
As of the census of 2010, there were 3,682 people, 1,489 households, and 943 families living in the city. The population density was 1,126.0 inhabitants per square mile (434.8/km^{2}). There were 1,579 housing units at an average density of 482.9 per square mile (186.4/km^{2}). The racial makeup of the city was 97.6% White, 0.3% African American, 0.2% Native American, 0.5% Asian, 0.2% Pacific Islander, 0.6% from other races, and 0.7% from two or more races. Hispanic or Latino of any race were 2.1% of the population.

There were 1,489 households, of which 34.4% had children under the age of 18 living with them, 47.5% were married couples living together, 11.1% had a female householder with no husband present, 4.6% had a male householder with no wife present, and 36.7% were non-families. 31.6% of all households were made up of individuals, and 12.8% had someone living alone who was 65 years of age or older. The average household size was 2.42 and the average family size was 3.06.

The median age in the city was 37.6 years. 26.8% of residents were under the age of 18; 7.7% were between the ages of 18 and 24; 25.7% were from 25 to 44; 27% were from 45 to 64; and 12.7% were 65 years of age or older. The gender makeup of the city was 47.4% male and 52.6% female.

=== 2000 census ===
As of the census of 2000, there were 3,435 people, 1,369 households, and 898 families living in the city. The population density was 1,050.1 inhabitants per square mile (405.4/km^{2}). There were 1,419 housing units at an average density of 433.8 per square mile (167.5/km^{2}). The racial makeup of the city was 97.76% White, 0.15% African American, 0.17% Native American, 0.41% Asian, 0.52% from other races, and 0.99% from two or more races. Hispanic or Latino of any race were 1.28% of the population.

There were 1,369 households, out of which 37.0% had children under the age of 18 living with them, 53.3% were married couples living together, 9.4% had a female householder with no husband present, and 34.4% were non-families. 30.3% of all households were made up of individuals, and 14.2% had someone living alone who was 65 years of age or older. The average household size was 2.46 and the average family size was 3.09.

28.5% are under the age of 18, 7.2% from 18 to 24, 29.5% from 25 to 44, 20.6% from 45 to 64, and 14.1% who were 65 years of age or older. The median age was 36 years. For every 100 females, there were 90.9 males. For every 100 females age 18 and over, there were 83.2 males.

The median income for a household in the city was $39,423, and the median income for a family was $47,065. Males had a median income of $34,234 versus $26,516 for females. The per capita income for the city was $19,743. About 3.1% of families and 4.0% of the population were below the poverty line, including none of those under age 18 and 8.5% of those age 65 or over.

== Economy ==
Stine Seed, the world's largest private seed company, is based in Adel. It has 15,000 acres of Iowa farmland and is almost entirely owned by Harry Stine and his four children.

== Education ==
Adel is within the Adel–De Soto–Minburn Community School District. The district formed on July 1, 1993, as a result of the merger of the Adel–De Soto Community School District and the Central Dallas Community School District.

== Notable people ==
- Turner W. Bell
- Sara Brenner, Acting Commissioner of FDA
- George W. Clarke (1852–1936), Iowa governor
- Eric Cutler, opera tenor
- Van Harden, radio personality
- Nile Kinnick, Iowa Hawkeyes football player, winner of 1939 Heisman Trophy
- Lillian M. Mitchner (1862/64-1954), social reformer
- Carter Nordman, member of the Iowa House of Representatives
- Charles Scott, lawyer and judge
- Harry Stine, businessman and Iowa's only billionaire
- Ralph Watts, member of the Iowa House of Representatives

== See also ==
- Raccoon River Valley Trail
