= Bruce Grose =

American football coach

Coaching career (HC unless noted)
- 1993–1997: McPherson

Head coaching record
- Overall: 15–33

Bruce Grose is an American former football coach. He served as the head football coach at McPherson College in McPherson, Kansas for five seasons, from 1993 to 1997, and compiling a record of 15–33.

== Head coaching record ==
Year	Team	Overall	Conference	Standing	Bowl/playoffs
McPherson Bulldogs (Kansas Collegiate Athletic Conference) (1993–1997)
1993	McPherson	0–8	0–8	9th	
1994	McPherson	0–10	0–8	9th	
1995	McPherson	4–6	4–4	T–5th	
1996	McPherson	5–5	4–4	5th	
1997	McPherson	6–4	4–4	T–5th	
McPherson:		15–33	12–28		
Total:		15–33			
