= Daniel Davis =

Daniel Davis, Danny Davis or Dan Davis may refer to:

== Arts and entertainment ==
- Daniel Davis (actor) (born 1945), an American actor
- Daniel Davis Jr. (1813–1887), American photographer
- Danny Davis (country musician) (1925–2008), American country music band leader, trumpet player and vocalist
- Dan Davis (broadcaster) (1942–2026), American radio personality
- Dan Davis (writer) (born 1953), American writer
- Daniel Davis, pseudonym used by Ed Wood in Glen or Glenda

== Politics ==
- Daniel F. Davis (1843–1897), American politician, Maine governor, 1880–1881
- Danny Davis (Illinois politician) (born 1941), U.S. Representative from Illinois
- Daniel Davis (Florida politician) (born 1973), American politician, Republican member of the Florida House of Representatives
- Dan Davis, American candidate in the United States House of Representatives elections in Michigan, 2010
- Daniel Davis (Massachusetts lawyer) (1762–1835), American Solicitor General for the Commonwealth of Massachusetts
- Dan Davis (New Hampshire politician), American politician, Republican member of the New Hampshire House of Representatives

== Sports ==
- Nightmare Danny Davis (born 1952), American former professional wrestler and referee
- Dangerous Danny Davis (born 1956), American former professional wrestling referee and wrestler
- Dan Davis (defensive lineman) (born 1986), American football defensive lineman
- Dan Davis (American football coach) (fl. 2000–2001), American football coach
- Danny Davis (snowboarder) (born 1988), American snowboarder
- Dan Davis (rugby union) (born 1998), Welsh rugby union player

== Others ==
- Daniel C. Davis (1804–1850), American captain in the Mormon Battalion
- Daniel Davis (bishop) (1788–1857), first Anglican bishop of Antigua
- Daniel M. Davis (born 1970), English professor of immunology and author of The Compatibility Gene
- Daniel L. Davis (fl. 1990s–2010s), United States Army officer and foreign policy analyst

== See also ==
- Daniel Davies (disambiguation)
- Dan David (businessman) (1929–2011), Romanian Israeli businessman
- David Daniel Davis (1777–1841), British physician
- Davis Daniel (born 1961), country music artist
