= Rominger =

Rominger is a German surname. It may refer to:

- Don Rominger (born 1940), American football coach
- Eileen Rominger, American Securities and Exchange Commission official and investor
- Joseph A. Rominger, California State Assemblyman
- Kent Rominger (born 1956), American astronaut and NASA official
- Richard Rominger (1927–2020), American politician
- Rudolf Rominger (1908–1979), Swiss alpine skier
- Tony Rominger (born 1961), Denmark-born Swiss racing cyclist
