= Steve Phipps =

American football coach

Coaching career (HC unless noted)
- 1984–1985: McPherson

Head coaching record
- Overall: 2–16

Steve Phipps is an American football coach. He was the head football coach at McPherson College in McPherson, Kansas, serving for two seasons, from 1984 to 1985, and compiling a record of 2–16.

== Head coaching record ==
Year	Team	Overall	Conference	Standing	Bowl/playoffs
McPherson Bulldogs (Kansas Collegiate Athletic Conference) (1984–1985)
1984	McPherson	1–8	1–8	9th	
1985	McPherson	1–8	1–8	10th	
McPherson:		2–16	2–16		
Total:		2–16			
