= William Knuckles =

American football and basketball coach

Biographical details
- Born: February 25, 1928 (age 98); Sioux City, Iowa, U.S.
- Died: June 4, 2016 (aged 88); Spokane, Washington, U.S.

Coaching career (HC unless noted)

Football
- 1951–1953: Phillips County HS (CO) (assistant)
- ?–1955: Yuma HS (CO) (assistant)
- c. 1958: Whitworth (assistant)
- 1960: Idaho (assistant)
- 1964–1965: Southern Illinois (assistant)
- 1968: Louisville (OL)
- 1969–1970: McPherson
- 1974–1975: Rocky Mountain

Basketball
- 1951–1954: Phillips County HS (CO)
- ?–1956: Yuma County HS (CO)
- 1957–1960: Whitworth
- 1977–?: Northwest Christian HS (WA)

Administrative career (AD unless noted)
- 1977–?: Northwest Christian HS (WA)

Head coaching record
- Overall: 6–27–1 (college football); 24–57 (college basketball)

William Gene Knuckles (April 25, 1928 – June 4, 2016) was an American football and basketball coach. He served as head football coach at McPherson College in McPherson, Kansas from the 1969 to 1970 and at Rocky Mountain College in Billings, Montana from 1974 to 1975. Knuckles was also the head basketball coach at Whitworth College—now known as Whitworth University—in Spokane, Washington from 1957 to 1960, tallying a mark of 24–57. He was hired in 1977 as athletic director and basketball coach at Northwest Christian High School in Spokane.

== Head coaching record ==
=== College football ===
| Year | Team | Overall | Conference | Standing | Bowl/playoffs |
|---|---|---|---|---|---|
McPherson Bulldogs (Kansas Collegiate Athletic Conference) (1969–1970)
| 1969 | McPherson | 0–8 | 0–5 | 6th (North) | |
| 1970 | McPherson | 1–8 | 1–4 | 5th (North) | |
| McPherson: | | 1–16 | 1–9 | | |
Rocky Mountain Bears (Frontier Conference) (1974–1975)
| 1974 | Rocky Mountain | 2–5–1 | 1–2–1 | T–3rd | |
| 1975 | Rocky Mountain | 3–6 | 2–2 | T–2nd | |
| Rocky Mountain: | | 5–11–1 | 3–4–1 | | |
| Total: | | 6–27–1 | | | |
