= Steve Fox =

Steve Fox may refer to:

- Steve Fox (American football), college football coach
- Steve Fox (footballer) (1958–2012), English football player
- Steve Fox (musician) (born 1964), Canadian country music singer
- Steve Fox (politician) (born 1953), California politician
- Steve Fox (actor) (1966–1997), American actor and model
- Steve Fox (Tekken), fictional British boxer in the Tekken fighting game series
- Steve Fox, bass guitarist of Japanese musical group Godiego

== See also ==
- Stephen Fox (disambiguation)
- Steven Fox (born 1978), American conductor of classical music
- Steven Fox (golfer) (born 1991), American golfer
