= Rolla Reiling =

American football coach

Biographical details
- Born: August 24, 1910; Burnt Prairie, Illinois, U.S.
- Died: August 10, 2000 (aged 89); White County, Illinois, U.S.

Coaching career (HC unless noted)
- 1947: McPherson

Head coaching record
- Overall: 1–6

George Rolla Reiling (August 24, 1910 – August 10, 2000) was an American football coach. He was the head football coach at McPherson College in McPherson, Kansas, serving for one season, in 1947, and compiling a record of 1–6.

== Head coaching record ==
Year	Team	Overall	Conference	Standing	Bowl/playoffs
McPherson Bulldogs (Kansas Collegiate Athletic Conference) (1947)
1947	McPherson	1–6	0–6	7th	
McPherson:		1–6	0–6		
Total:		1–6			
