= Daniel Davies =

Daniel or Dan Davies may refer to:

- Daniel Davies (Australian politician) (1872–1951), member of the South Australian House of Assembly
- Daniel Davies (bishop) (1863–1928), Anglican bishop of Bangor, 1925–1928
- Daniel Davies (Canadian politician) (1825–1911), Canadian merchant and political figure
- Daniel Davies (musician), British-American musician and composer
- Daniel Davies (rugby league), Welsh rugby league footballer
- Daniel Davies (preacher) (1797–1876), Welsh Baptist preacher
- Daniel John Davies (1885–1970), Welsh Baptist minister and poet
- Daniel Davies (physician, born 1899) (1899–1966), Welsh physician
- Daniel Oliver Davies (died 1977), British general practitioner
- Dan Davies (actor) (born 1965), American actor
- Dan Davies (writer) (born 1970), British journalist and author of In Plain Sight: The Life and Lies of Jimmy Savile (2014)
- Dan Davies (politician) (elected 2017), Canadian politician
- Daniel Davies (bowls), Welsh lawn and indoor bowler
- Dan Davies, British former bank regulator and author of The Unaccountability Machine (2024)

== See also ==
- Daniel Davis (disambiguation)
