= Dwight McSpadden =

American football coach (1932–1990)

Biographical details
- Born: February 21, 1932
- Died: July 11, 1990 (aged 58); Dallas, Texas, U.S.

Coaching career (HC unless noted)
- 1967–1968: McPherson

Head coaching record
- Overall: 2–16

Dwight Ervin McSpadden (February 21, 1932 – July 11, 1990) was an American football coach. He was the head football coach at McPherson College in McPherson, Kansas for the 1967 and 1968 seasons. His coaching record at McPherson was 2–16.

== Head coaching record ==
Year	Team	Overall	Conference	Standing	Bowl/playoffs
McPherson Bulldogs (Kansas Collegiate Athletic Conference) (1967–1968)
1967	McPherson	0–9	0–9	10th	
1968	McPherson	2–7	2–7	10th	
McPherson:		2–16	2–16		
Total:		2–16			
