= Dan Davis (American football coach) =

American football coach

Coaching career (HC unless noted)
- 2000–2001: McPherson

Head coaching record
- Overall: 4–15

Dan Davis is an American football coach. He was the head football coach at McPherson College in McPherson, Kansas, serving for two seasons, from 2000 to 2001, and compiling a record of 4–15.

== Head coaching record ==
Year	Team	Overall	Conference	Standing	Bowl/playoffs
McPherson Bulldogs (Kansas Collegiate Athletic Conference) (2000–2001)
2000	McPherson	1–8	1–8	9th	
2001	McPherson	3–7	2–7	8th	
McPherson:		4–15	3–15		
Total:		4–15			
