= Lee Dobyns =

American football player and coach

Biographical details
- Born: 1934 or 1935 (age 91–92)

Playing career
- 1953–1954: Eastern Montana
- Position: Quarterback

Coaching career (HC unless noted)
- 1980: McPherson
- 1984–1986: Billings CC HS (MT)
- 1987–1988: Rocky Mountain

Head coaching record
- Overall: 7–21 (college)

Accomplishments and honors

Awards
- First-team All-Frontier Conference (1953)

Lee Dobyns (born c. 1935) is an American former football coach. He served as the head football coach at McPherson College in McPherson, Kansas. He held that position for the 1980 season. His coaching record at McPherson was 2–7.

== Head coaching record ==
=== College ===
Year	Team	Overall	Conference	Standing	Bowl/playoffs
McPherson Bulldogs (Kansas Collegiate Athletic Conference) (1980)
1980	McPherson	2–7	2–6	T–8th	
McPherson:		2–7	2–6		
Rocky Mountain Battlin' Bears (Frontier Conference) (1987–1988)
1987	Rocky Mountain	2–6	0–4	3rd	
1988	Rocky Mountain	3–8	1–5	T–3rd	
Rocky Mountain:		5–14	1–9		
Total:		7–21			
