= National FFA Organization =

American agricultural youth organization

- Formation: 1928; 98 years ago
- Type: Youth organization
- Legal status: 501(c)(3) nonprofit
- Headquarters: U.S. Department of Education Office of Career, Technical, and Adult Education 1410 King Street, Alexandria, Virginia, 22314, U.S.; 6060 FFA Drive, Indianapolis, Indiana 46278, U.S.
- Region served: United States; Puerto Rico; United States Virgin Islands
- Members: 1,027,273 (9,235 chapters in 50 state associations and 2 territories)
- National FFA Advisor, Board Chair: Travis Park
- Chief Executive Officer: Scott Stump
- National FFA President: Josie Jennings
- Website: ffa.org
- Formerly called: Future Farmers of Virginia

The National FFA Organization or FFA is an American nonprofit career and technical student organization, which offers middle and high school classes that promote and support agricultural education. Future Farmers of Virginia (FFV) was founded in 1925 at Virginia Polytechnic Institute, by agriculture teachers Henry C. Groseclose, Walter Newman, Edmund Magill, and Harry Sanders as Future Farmers of Virginia. In 1928, it became a nationwide organization known as Future Farmers of America at the first National FFA Convention, a convention of multiple state organizations similar to FFV. FFA was based on FFV.

In 1988, the name was changed to the National FFA Organization, now commonly referred to as FFA, to recognize that the organization is for students with diverse interests in the food, fiber, and natural resource industries, encompassing science, business, and technology in addition to production agriculture. FFA is among the largest youth organizations in the United States, with 1,042,245 members in 9,163 chapters throughout all 50 states, Puerto Rico, and the Virgin Islands. FFA is the largest of the career and technical student organizations in U.S. schools.

The organization holds a congressional charter under Title 36 of the United States Code.

== Overview ==
The National FFA Organization is a youth leadership and agricultural organization that aims to develop students' potential for premier leadership, personal growth, and career success through agricultural education. The FFA Motto is Learning to Do, Doing to Learn, Learning to Live, Living to Serve.

FFA functions within the three-circle model of agricultural education as a student leadership organization that complements a student's classroom/laboratory instruction and supervised agricultural experience program. FFA members can compete in Career Development Events (CDE) that cover agricultural career skills such as agricultural communication, meat evaluation, land judging, tractor driving, and more. Some events allow students to compete as individuals, while others allow them to compete in teams. These competitions can happen at a local or district level, state level, and on the national level.

Students are taught by educators with the help of parents, employers, and adults who assist in their development by helping them achieve their educational and career goals.

The official colors of FFA are national blue and corn gold.

== Supervised Agricultural Experience programs ==
To be an active member in the National FFA Organization, a member must have a Supervised Agricultural Experience (SAE) project. The projects involve hands-on application of concepts and principles learned in the agricultural education classroom, with guidelines for the SAE projects governed by the state FFA delegation. SAE programs are grouped into four areas:

- Foundational – learning about the 'big picture' of agriculture and related careers
- Research/Experimentation and Analysis – conducting research or analysis of information to discover new knowledge
- Ownership/Entrepreneurship – planning and operation of an agriculture-related business
- Placement/Internship – working either for pay or experience in an agricultural setting

== Official FFA dress ==
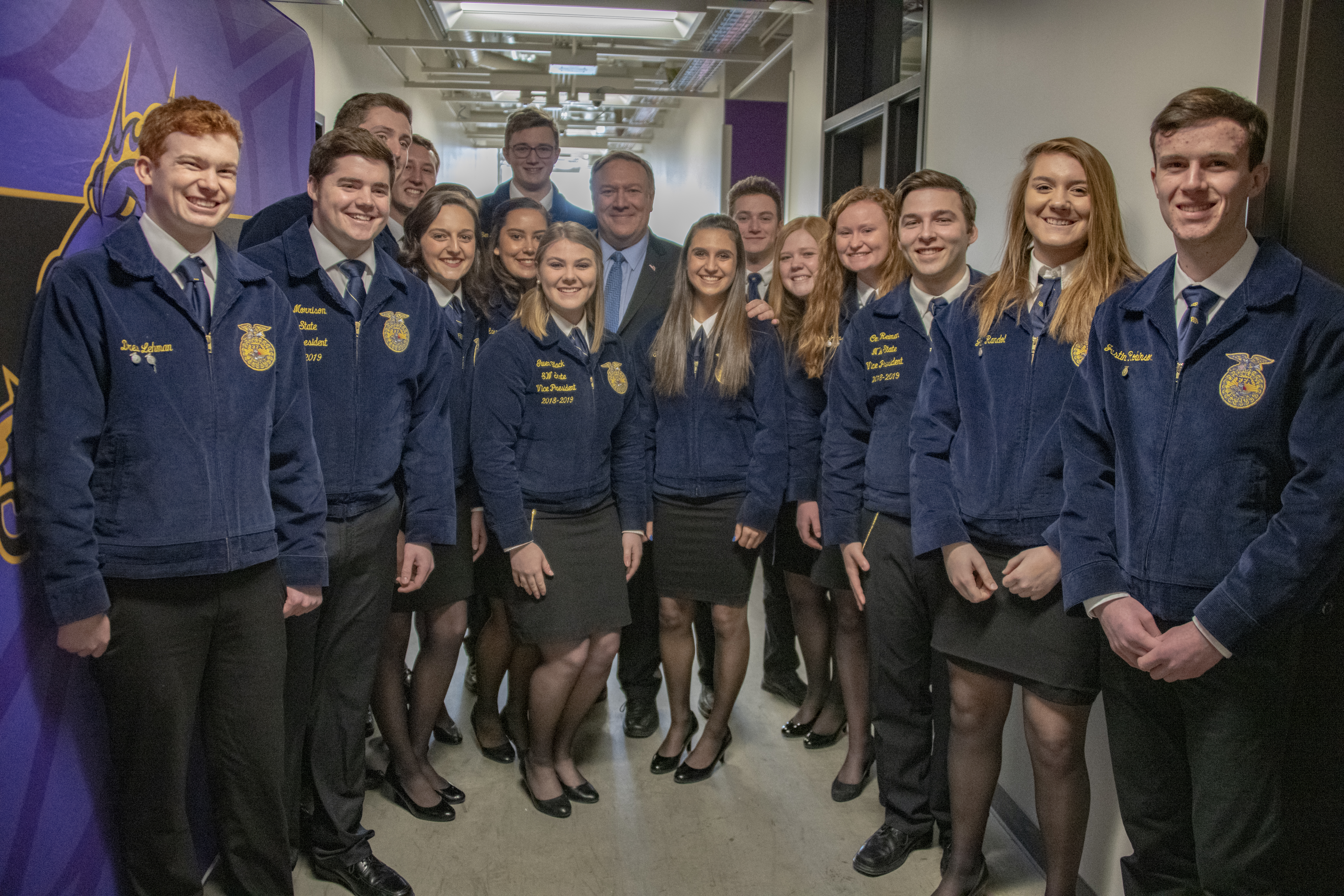
Secretary of State Mike Pompeo with Iowa FFA students in 2019

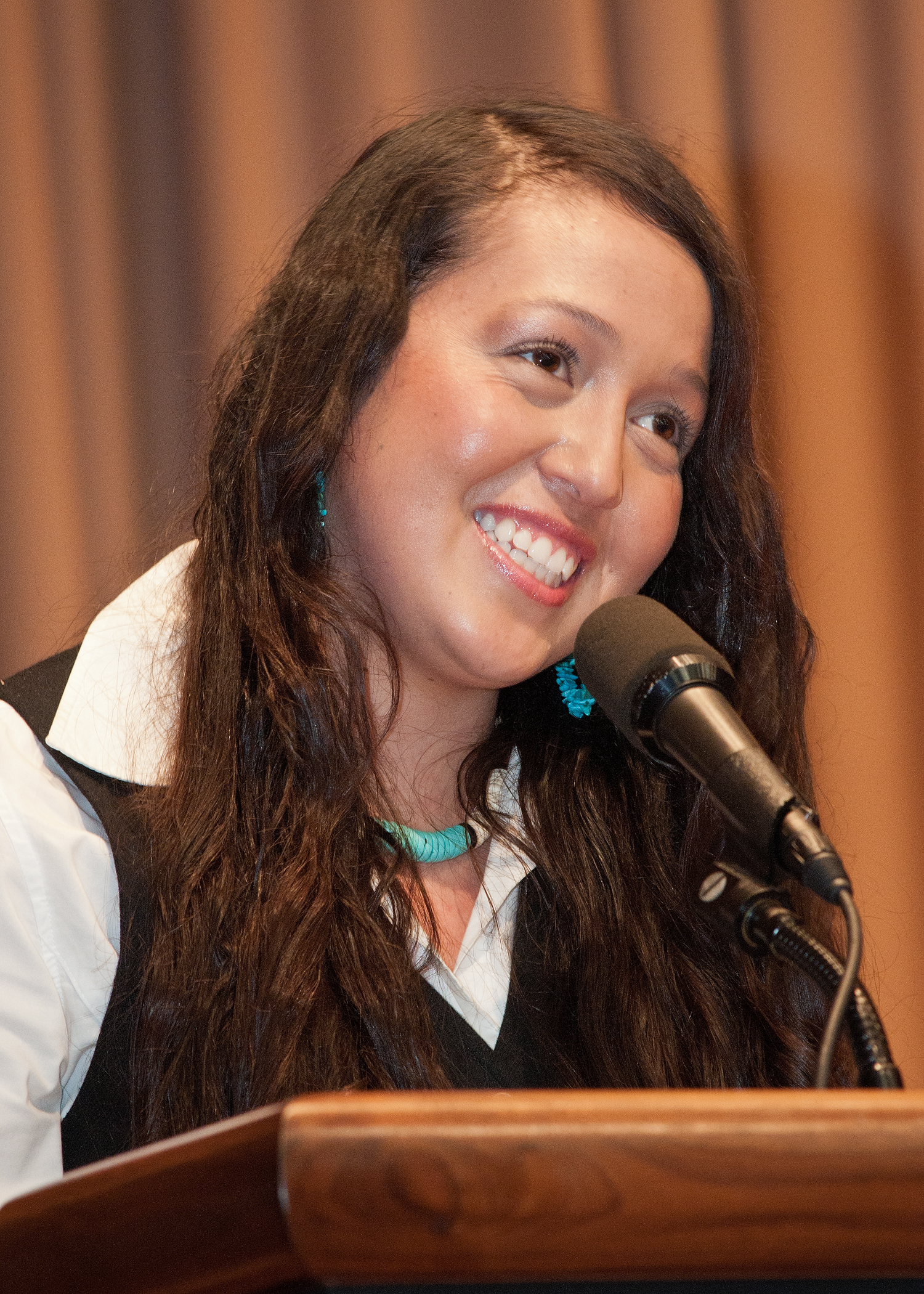
Odessa Oldham, of Casper College in Wyoming, explained her role in the National FFA Organization to the United States Department of Agriculture, as part of its Native American Indian Heritage Month celebration in Washington D.C., in November 2011.

=== FFA jacket ===
The most recognizable symbol of the organization is the blue corduroy jacket that is worn by FFA members. The back of the jacket features a large FFA emblem underneath the name of the member's state. The name of the local FFA chapter, district, region or area is embroidered below the emblem. The front of the FFA jacket features a smaller FFA emblem on the left chest and the FFA member's name and sometimes, if applicable, office and year on the right chest. Members may also wear award pins or officer pins under their names. FFA members are required to wear the jacket as part of the official dress while participating in all official organization activities.

The FFA jacket was created to be worn by the Fredericktown Band of the Fredericktown FFA Chapter by Dr. Gus Lintner. It was adopted in 1933.

The color of the jacket's corduroy has ranged from shades of blue to shades of purple through the years. In 2001, the National FFA Organization worked with a supplier in North Carolina to set a new standard for the blue corduroy by using samples from archived FFA jackets. The jacket's color standardization was accompanied by a restoration of the embroidered FFA emblems and fit corrections led by Clemson University's Apparel Research Center. The improved FFA jacket, produced in both Van Wert, Ohio and South Vietnam, was first made available in August 2005. Currently, all lettering, embroidery and finishing of FFA jackets is completed by Universal Lettering Company in Van Wert, Ohio.

=== Elements of FFA official dress ===
FFA members are required to wear official FFA dress while participating in official organization activities. In 2016, the National FFA Organization updated its bylaws, stating that members may wear any item they are comfortable in, including those which were previously reserved for only one gender. Religious garb, such as headwear, is also allowed.

Official dress consists of black slacks or a black skirt, a white button-up shirt with collar, an official FFA blue scarf or tie, black dress shoes with closed heel and toe, black socks or black sheer nylon hosiery, and an official FFA jacket zipped to the top.

=== Awards and pins ===
FFA members earn metal pins that signify achievement within the organization. These pins can be placed on the front of the FFA jacket; however, official guidelines state that no more than three pins may be worn at one time. The pins are to be placed beneath the FFA member's name on the right chest and can recognize the highest degree, highest office, and/or highest award in that order from left to right. Two exceptions exist within pin placement guidelines. When an FFA member earns a State FFA Degree or American FFA Degree, the award keys should be worn above the name on the right chest or attached to the FFA jacket with a standard key chain, and no other pins should accompany these.

== Traditions ==
Former FFA emblem in use until February 2015.

FFA has many traditions and trademarks identifying it as an agricultural education organization:

The FFA Motto: Learning to Do, Doing to Learn, Earning to Live, Living to Serve.

The FFA Mission: The National FFA Organization is dedicated to making a positive difference in the lives of students by developing their potential for premier leadership, personal growth, and career success through agricultural education.

The Official FFA Colors: National Blue and Corn Gold (worn on the Official FFA jackets).

The FFA Emblem: Cross section of the ear of corn: represents unity. Wherever you live in the United States, corn is grown everywhere. Rising Sun: signifies progress. It represents that tomorrow will always bring a new day. Plow: signifies labor and tillage of the soil. It also shows the historic foundation of our country's strength. Eagle: symbolizes freedom and our ability to explore the new agriculture world. Owl: represents knowledge. Long recognized for wisdom and knowledge. Agriculture Education and FFA: symbolizes the combination of learning and leadership.

The FFA Creed: The creed was written by Erwin Milton "E.M." Tiffany of Lyndon, Kansas and adopted at the 3rd National FFA Convention. It was revised at the 38th and 63rd National FFA Conventions by the assembled delegate body. It is recited by new members to the organization to reflect their growing belief in agriculture and agricultural education. The FFA Creed also must be memorized and recited to earn the Greenhand Degree.

I believe in the future of agriculture, with a faith born not of words but of deeds – achievements won by the present and past generations of agriculturists; in the promise of better days through better ways, even as the better things we now enjoy have come to us from the struggles of former years.

I believe that to live and work on a good farm or to be engaged in other agricultural pursuits, is pleasant as well as challenging; for I know the joys and discomforts of agricultural life and hold an inborn fondness for those associations which, even in hours of discouragement I cannot deny.

I believe in leadership from ourselves and respect from others. I believe in my own ability to work efficiently and think clearly, with such knowledge and skill as I can secure, and in the ability of progressive agriculturists to serve our own and the public interest in producing and marketing the product of our toil.

I believe in less dependence on begging and more power in bargaining; in the life abundant and enough honest wealth to help make it so-for others as well as myself; in less need for charity and more of it when needed; in being happy myself and playing square with those whose happiness depends upon me.

I believe that American agriculture can and will hold true to the best traditions of our national life and that I can exert an influence in my home and community which will stand solid for my part in that inspiring task.

== Structure ==
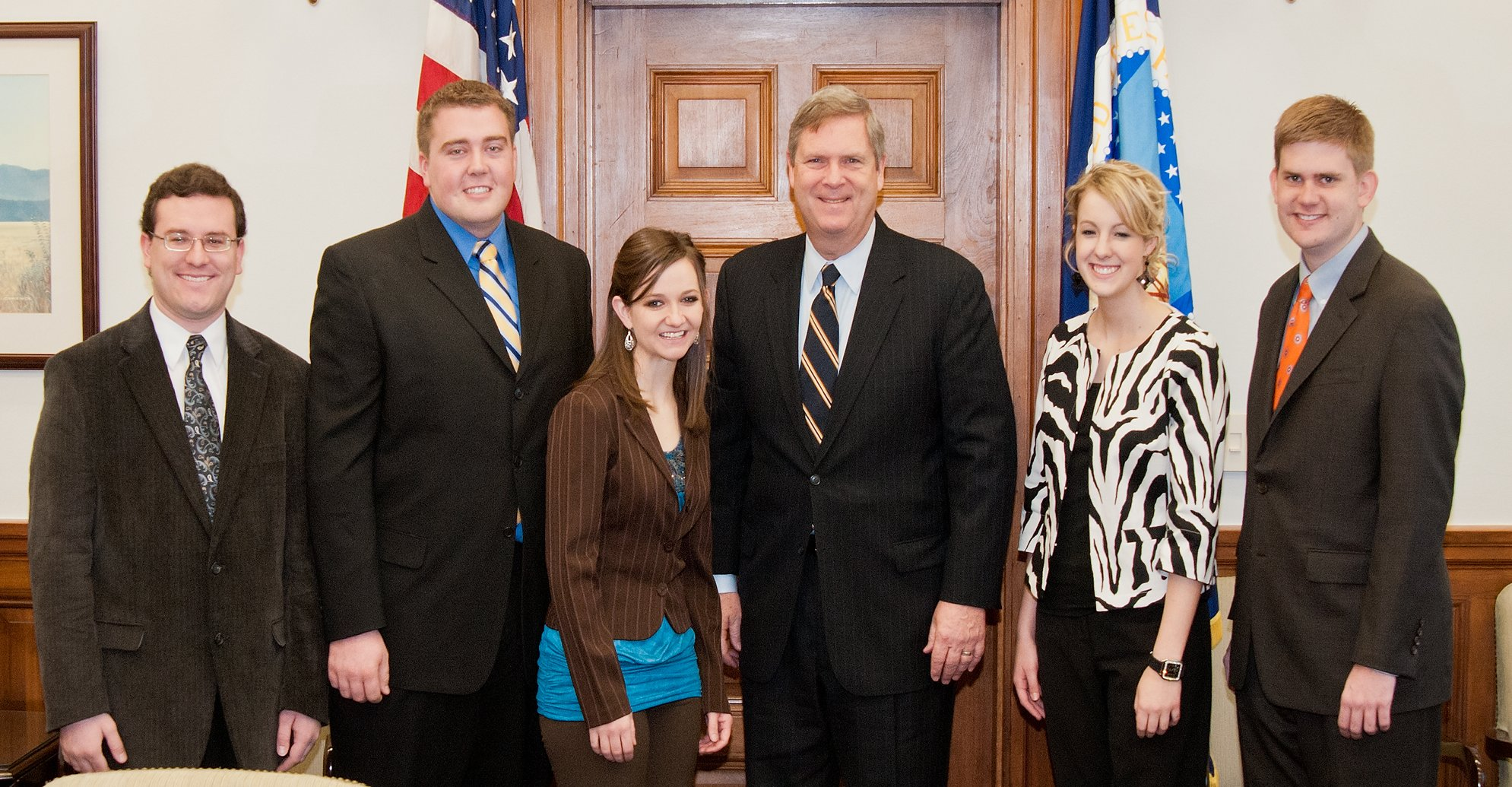
United States Secretary of Agriculture Tom Vilsack (third from right) stands with five former National FFA officers in 2011.

FFA is represented at several different levels across the nation; FFA administration may change from state to state. The basic levels are the national level, serving all of the United States of America, Puerto Rico and the U.S. Virgin Islands; the state level, serving an individual state association; and the chapter level, serving a school or set of schools in an area. By definition, there can be three types of chapters at the secondary level, they are middle for middle school, junior for ninth grade and senior which can be either tenth through twelfth or ninth through twelfth depending on the school. Other levels include districts, sub districts, sections, regions, areas, and federations.

FFA was created to serve high school students and has moved into middle schools where membership may begin as early as age 12, allowing members to become active earlier and stay active longer. Each chapter is chartered as part of the state association and national organization.

Most states hold FFA conventions at least once annually, where members gather to compete, be recognized for awards, attend leadership workshops, debate organizational issues in a delegate process, and more. Nationally, the National FFA Convention & Expo is held once a year in the fall. It was held in Kansas City, Missouri, from 1928 to 1998. The convention moved to Louisville, Kentucky, in 1999 before moving again in 2006 to Indianapolis, Indiana. Louisville again hosted the national convention from 2013 to 2015. FFA announced in July 2015 that the national convention would be hosted in Indianapolis each year from 2016 to 2024. In 2018, FFA announced that the national convention would be hosted in Indianapolis each year from 2025 to 2031. In 2023 FFA announced an extension of the Indianapolis contract. The National Convention is now set to be held in Indianapolis until 2033

== Officers of FFA ==
As FFA is a student-led organization intended to serve youth around the nation, it elects officers from its own diverse membership to certain levels of FFA. With these basic constitutional officers a basis of parliamentary procedure is completed during meetings and banquets; each officer during these procedures will stand and recite their office level and what it is stationed by, and why the particular position is stationed as so. Typical officer roles are:

=== Constitutional officers ===
- President — Stationed by the rising sun, a token of a new era in agriculture; presides over meetings
- Vice President — Stationed by the plow, the symbol of labor and tillage of the soil; presides over meetings in the absence of the president
- Secretary — Stationed by the ear of corn, to keep an accurate record of all meetings and correspond with other secretaries wherever corn is grown and FFA members meet
- Treasurer — Stationed by the emblem of George Washington, to keep a record of receipts and disbursements just as Washington kept his farm accounts, carefully and accurately
- Reporter — Stationed by the flag, strives to inform the public in order that every man, woman, and child may know that FFA is a national organization that reaches from the state of Alaska to the Virgin Islands and from the state of Maine to Hawaii
- Sentinel — Stationed by the door, the sentinel ensures the door is open to all, cares for the meeting room and paraphernalia, strives to keep the meeting room comfortable as well as assists the president in maintaining order

=== Others may include ===
- Chaplain — Stationed by the white dove, Bible or the keystone. The Chaplain presides over prayers and invocations at events.
- Parliamentarian — Stationed by the Fasces or a copy of Robert's Rules of Order. Parliamentarian's ensure parliamentary procedure is always followed.
- Historian — Stationed at the scroll or chapter scrapbook. Historians maintain the chapter scrap book and keep records of past events. They may also work closely with the chapter Reporter.
- Student Advisor — Stationed by the owl or the key. Student advisors take some of the roles of the advisor. Assisting where ever needed. A student advisor may also perform the duties of an officer in their absence (minus president and Vice President)
- Executive Committee/Executive Board

Each officer is an agriculture student and holds responsibilities needed to serve. Officers are elected each year by members at the respective level.

=== National officers ===
At the national level, the organization has student-held positions of president, secretary, and vice president for each of the four administrative regions (Eastern, Southern, Central, and Western).

== Notable historic events and milestones ==
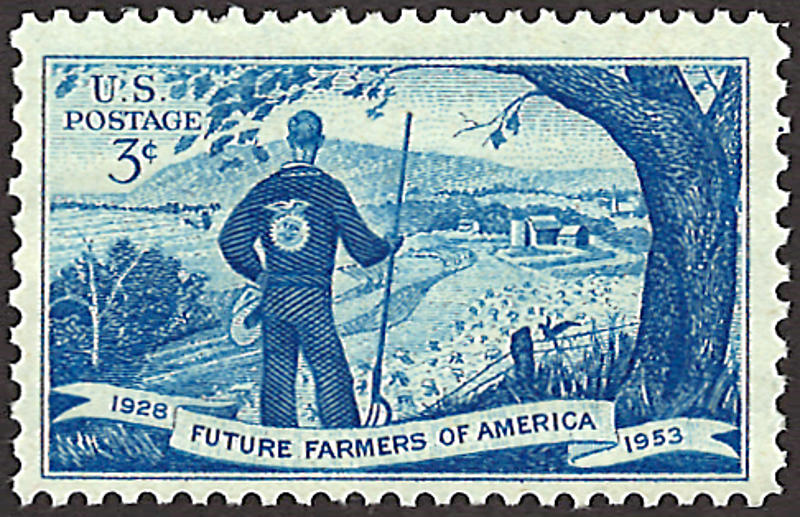
Commemorative 25th anniversary Future Farmers of America postage stamp issued on October 13, 1953

NFA Emblem from 4 August, 1935 until FFA-NFA merger in 1965

- 1928: FFA is established.
- 1929: National Blue and Corn Gold are adopted as official colors.
- 1930: Official FFA creed adopted.
- 1944: FFA Foundation formed.
- 1950: Congress grants FFA a Federal Charter, recognizing the importance of FFA as an integral component of School-Based Agricultural Education.
- 1953: FFA U.S. postage stamp issued by U.S. Postal Service.
- 1965: FFA was desegregated; FFA absorbed the New Farmers of America organization for students of color.
- 1969: FFA membership becomes available to female students.
- 1988: Official Name change from Future Farmers of America to National FFA Organization.
- 2006: National FFA Foundation receives first $1 million contribution from Ford Motor Company.
- 2010: FFA members earn a record 3,449 American FFA Degrees.
- 2011: National FFA Alumni Association celebrates its 40-year anniversary.
- 2014: Official Spanish FFA Creed adopted
- 2015: National FFA celebrates 50 years of desegregation following the merger of FFA and NFA.
- 2017: National FFA elects first female African-American National President, Ms. Breanna Holbert from the State of California.
- 2019: FFA celebrates 50 years of female leaders in the organization.

== Career & Leadership Development Events ==
FFA Career and Leadership Development Events (CDE/LDEs) are competitions that members compete in to test their skills learned through agricultural education instruction. They vary at the different levels of FFA, and some are contested only at certain levels or in specific states, districts, areas, or regions.

At the national level, there are 25 Career and Leadership Development Events offered:

- Agricultural Communications
- Agricultural Issues Forum
- Agricultural Sales
- Agricultural Technology & Mechanical System
- Agronomy
- Conduct of Chapter Meetings
- Creed Speaking
- Dairy Cattle Evaluation & Management
- Employment Skills
- Environmental & Natural Resources
- Extemporaneous Public Speaking
- Farm & Agribusiness Management
- Floriculture
- Food Science & Technology
- Forestry
- Horse Evaluation
- Livestock Evaluation
- Marketing Plan
- Meats Evaluation & Technology
- Milk Quality & Products
- Nursery/Landscape
- Parliamentary Procedure
- Poultry Evaluation
- Prepared Public Speaking
- Veterinary Science

Examples of CDE/LDEs offered in some states but not at the national level include:

- Agricultural Mechanics Skills
- Cattle Evaluation
- Horse Evaluation
- Livestock Evaluation
- Tractor driving
- Parliamentary Procedure and Law
- Range Judging
- Veterinary Science
- Quiz Bowl

== Talent competition, band, and chorus ==
In addition to the various Career and Leadership Development Events, the organization also hosts a national band and chorus alongside a talent competition. Although not officially recognized until the 20th National FFA Convention, concert bands have been present in the FFA since 1933. The debut of the National FFA Chorus and Talent was in 1948 at the 20th National FFA Convention in Kansas City, Missouri. Since then, members of the talent competition chorus, and band have provided entertainment at each National FFA Convention during the sessions. Members of the talent competition must apply and audition directly in the case that their state does not host a competition. In this instance, they must win their own state competition to qualify. Similarly, members seeking to be in the national band and chorus must apply to participate.

== Notable alumni ==
=== In politics ===
- Tom Brewer, state FFA officer, decorated military officer and two-term Nebraska state senator
- Sam Brownback, United States Ambassador at Large for International Religious Freedom, former Governor of Kansas, former United States Senator, former United States representative, past state FFA President and national FFA vice president
- Harold Brubaker, North Carolina state representative, past National FFA Secretary from Pennsylvania
- Jimmy Carter, Governor of Georgia, 39th President of the United States
- Kyle Hilbert, Oklahoma Speaker of the House, Former Oklahoma Northeast District Vice President
- Matt Lohr, Chief of USDA's Natural Resources Conservation Service, former Virginia state representative, past state FFA President and National FFA Vice President
- Bruce Maloch, Arkansas state senator, past state FFA President and National FFA Secretary
- Jeff Miller, United States Representative from Florida, past state FFA Secretary
- Rick Perry, former United States Secretary of Energy, former Governor of Texas, past district FFA officer
- Brooke Rollins, United States Secretary of Agriculture, former Texas FFA vice president
- Jason Smith, United States Representative from Missouri
- Joe Wright, Kentucky State Senate majority floor leader from 1981 to 1992 and founding member of the Kentucky FFA Foundation

=== In entertainment ===
- Trace Adkins, country music singer
- Nicolas Cage, actor
- Johnny Cash, country and rock & roll music singer/songwriter, actor
- Chris Colfer, actor best known for Glee
- Easton Corbin, country music singer/songwriter
- Steve Doocy, network-television personality on the Fox News Channel and a best selling author; co-host of Fox & Friends in the mornings
- Matthew Fox, actor best known for Lost and Party of Five
- Wyatt Flores, country music singer
- Brantley Gilbert, country music singer
- Don Henley, music entertainer
- Toby Keith, country music singer, actor
- Lyle Lovett, country music singer
- Taj Mahal, singer, songwriter, legally Henry Saint Clair Fredericks. Was dairy farmer in Massachusetts
- Tim McGraw, country music singer
- John Mellencamp, recording artist, co-founder of Farm Aid
- Roger Miller, country music singer and songwriter
- Eddie Montgomery, country music singer, half of the duo Montgomery Gentry
- Craig Morgan, country music singer/songwriter
- Willie Nelson, country music singer
- Jim Ross, WWE Hall of Famer, past state FFA Vice President
- Orion Samuelson, radio broadcaster
- Josh Shipp, motivational speaker and entertainer
- Taylor Swift, country and pop music singer/songwriter, actress

=== In the arts ===
- Jim Davis, creator of the Garfield comic strip
- Jared Hess, director of Napoleon Dynamite
- Nicholas Kristof, Pulitzer Prize winner, past Oregon State Officer

=== Other ===
- Josh Allen, quarterback for the Buffalo Bills of the National Football League
- Dennis Anderson, former monster truck driver and founder of Grave Digger; four-time Monster Jam World Champion
- Leonard J. Arrington, Church of Jesus Christ of Latter Day Saints historian; "Dean of Mormon History", past National FFA Vice President
- Howard Warren Buffett, grandson of investor and philanthropist Warren Edward Buffett, past FFA chapter president
- Bill Catania, Motorsports driver, founder of OneRail & RaceFan.com, former National Eastern Region Vice President
- Bo Jackson, athlete; former multi-sport professional in football (NFL) and baseball (MLB)
- Sterling Marlin, NASCAR driver
- Brad Meester, football center for the Jacksonville Jaguars of the National Football League, past FFA chapter president
- Ellison Onizuka American astronaut, who successfully flew into space with Space Shuttle Discovery on STS-51-C. Died in the destruction of Space Shuttle Challenger
- Bryant Reeves, retired professional basketball player for the NBA's Vancouver Grizzlies
- Carroll Shelby, automotive designer, racing driver and entrepreneur
- Tammy Smith, military officer
- Chris Soules, The Bachelorette contestant and The Bachelor star, past Iowa FFA member
- Harry Stine, founder and owner of Stine Seed, past Iowa FFA member
- Mark Tauscher, offensive tackle for the Green Bay Packers of the National Football League
