= Steve Fox (American football) =

American football coach

Coaching career (HC unless noted)
- 2004–2005: Abilene Christian (LB)
- 2006: Tabor (DL)
- 2007: West Texas A&M (DB)
- 2008–2010: Howard Payne (DB)
- 2011: Oklahoma Panhandle State (DC)
- 2012–2013: McPherson (DC)
- 2014: McPherson
- 2015–?: Cisco (assistant)

Head coaching record
- Overall: 4–7

Steve Fox is an American football coach. He served as the head football coach at McPherson College in McPherson, Kansas for one season, in 2014. He replaced Pete Sterbick, who resigned after the end of the 2013 season.

Prior to his promotion to head coach at McPherson, Fox was an assistant coach and the defensive coordinator for the Bulldogs. He also worked as an assistant coach at Oklahoma Panhandle State University, Howard Payne University, West Texas A&M University, Tabor College, and Abilene Christian University.

After completing one season with a record of 4–7, Fox resigned to take a position as assistant coach at Cisco College.

== Head coaching record ==
Year	Team	Overall	Conference	Standing	Bowl/playoffs
McPherson Bulldogs (Kansas Collegiate Athletic Conference) (2014)
2014	McPherson	4–7	4–5	T–6th	
McPherson:		4–7	4–5		
Total:		4–7			
