= J. Willard Hershey =

American chemist

J Willard Hershey (6 February 1876, Gettysburg, Pennsylvania – 27 September 1943) was an American chemist who was best known for his work on synthetic diamond production. There is, however, some doubt whether his success was real, or whether co-workers introduced the diamonds without his knowledge. He also studied the effects of rare gases such as helium on animal life.

He was awarded a B.S. degree in 1907 and an M.S. degree in 1910 by Gettysburg College. He studied at Harvard in 1907 and 1908 and at Johns Hopkins University in 1910 and 1911, and was awarded a Ph.D. by the University of Chicago in 1924. He was head of McPherson College's chemistry department from 1918 to 1945, and became president of the Kansas Academy of Science in 1933.
