= Dan Thiessen =

American football player and coach (1946–2014)

Biographical details
- Born: May 27, 1946; Wasco, California, U.S.
- Died: November 1, 2014 (aged 68); Bakersfield, California, U.S.

Coaching career (HC unless noted)
- 1978–1980: Tabor
- 1986–1992: McPherson
- 1993–1998: Tabor

Head coaching record
- Overall: 39–113 (college)

Nicholas Dan Thiessen (May 27, 1946 – November 1, 2014) was an American football player and coach. He served as the head football coach at Tabor College in Hillsboro, Kansas from 1978 to 1980 and again from 1993 to 1998 and at McPherson College in McPherson, Kansas from 1986 to 1992. Thiessen played professionally in the Canadian Football League (CFL).

== Coaching career ==
=== McPherson ===
Thiessen was the head football coach for the McPherson College in McPherson, Kansas. He held that position for seven seasons, from 1986 until 1992. His coaching record at McPherson was 21 wins and 44 losses.

=== Tabor ===
Thiessen was the head football coach of the Tabor College in Hillsboro, Kansas for six seasons, from 1993 to 1998. Theissen played quarterback for the college as well as competing on the tennis team before taking the coaching position.

=== High school ===
Thiessen also coached at the high school level, primarily in the Bakersfield, California area.

== Head coaching record ==
=== College ===
Year	Team	Overall	Conference	Standing	Bowl/playoffs
Tabor Bluejays (Kansas Collegiate Athletic Conference) (1978–1980)
1978	Tabor	4–6	4–4	5th	
1979	Tabor	7–3	7–1	2nd	
1980	Tabor	2–7	2–6	T–8th	
McPherson Bulldogs (Kansas Collegiate Athletic Conference) (1986–1980)
1986	McPherson	0–9	0–9	10th	
1987	McPherson	1–8	1–8	T–9th	
1988	McPherson	6–4	6–3	T–2nd	
1989	McPherson	5–5	4–5	T–5th	
1990	McPherson	3–7	2–7	T–7th	
1991	McPherson	1–8	1–8	T–9th	
1990	McPherson	3–5	3–5	T–5th	
McPherson:		19–46	17–45		
Tabor Bluejays (Kansas Collegiate Athletic Conference) (1993–1998)
1993	Tabor	4–4	4–4	T–4th	
1994	Tabor	1–9	1–7	8th	
1995	Tabor	0–10	0–8	9th	
1996	Tabor	0–10	0–8	9th	
1997	Tabor	1–9	0–8	9th	
1998	Tabor	1–9	1–7	9th	
Tabor:		20–67	19–53		
Total:		39–113			
