= Henry C. Groseclose =

American agricultural academic (1892–1950)

- Born: Henry Casper Groseclose Jr. May 17, 1892; Ceres, Bland County, Virginia
- Died: June 4, 1950 (aged 58); Bluefield, West Virginia
- Resting place: Sharon Lutheran Church Cemetery
- Education: Washington and Lee University
- Occupations: Agriculture teacher trainer Teacher; Agricultural education instructor
- Years active: 1924-1945
- Organization: National FFA Organization
- Spouses: Dorothy Dell Saxton Groseclose (m. 1917; died 1947); Marie Carr (m. 1947; died 1950)

Henry C. Groseclose (May 17, 1892 – June 4, 1950) was an American teacher, agricultural teacher trainer, and agricultural education instructor best known for his work for the future farmers of America.

Born on May 17, 1892. Groseclose lived in Ceres, Virginia for most of his life. Groseclose completed his junior college degree from Washington and Lee University in 1917. In his later years, he also received his bachelor's degree, as well as his master's degree, in agricultural education from Virginia Tech. While Groseclose was an agriculture teacher at the Virginia Polytechnic Institute, he, along with three other agriculture teachers, Walter Newman, Edmund Magill and Harry Sanders, decided to establish a club for the farm boys in the school. The organization was formed in 1925. Groseclose named the organization the Future Farmers of Virginia, or FFV for short.

The original meaning for the abbreviation FFV stood for the First Families of Virginia. The "first families" referred to the families of both George Washington and Thomas Jefferson. Referring to Washington and Jefferson, Groseclose once stated that, "The Future Farmers of America should follow the example of these great sons of early Virginia by using scientific knowledge, intelligence, and enthusiasm to the end that agriculture may again be known as the profession of the real aristocrat." Groseclose wrote the by-laws, as well as the constitution that the FFV would be based on.

In 1926, he also wrote, and brought into play, the formal ceremony that would take place as an organizational pattern to structure each meeting. Two years later, in 1928, the FFV became a nationwide organization. This developed the organization that is known today as the Future Farmers of America, or The National FFA Organization, or just FFA for short. The by-laws drawn up by Groseclose became the foundation of the newly national organization. Also, the formal ceremony that Groseclose developed was taken on by the FFA as a national ritual that is still used today. Groseclose was a seventh degree Grange member, and he was also involved with the Masons, so it was no surprise when he developed levels of memberships for the FFV, which transferred through to the FFA, that were similar to the three leveled membership structure that the Masons uses. These three levels included the Greenhand, the Virginia Farmer and the Virginia Planter.

While the official emblem of the National FFA Organization was being drawn, Groseclose's original emblem, which he hand drew himself, was highly considered and ended up playing a part in the emblem that is still the emblem of the National FFA Organization today. The part of the emblem that was from Groseclose's original drawing included a background setting of a half plowed wheat field with an owl perched upon a spade of wheat in front of the field.

Groseclose served as the Executive Secretary of the National FFA Organization for two years between 1928 and 1930. During his time as Executive Secretary, he announced at the national convention of 1930 that he had written, and would be releasing, an official FFA manual, which outlined the organization, procedures and structures of the National FFA Organization. Groseclose also served as the Treasurer of the National FFA Organization for 11 years, between 1930 and 1941.

In September 1925, Groseclose set his expectations for the members of the FFV, and the purpose of the establishment of the Future Farmers of Virginia was by saying, "In my opinion the farm boys of Virginia who are enrolled in vocational agriculture are equal to any other group of boys in the state. But somehow the boys themselves seem to have a feeling of inferiority. Especially is this true when the farm boy goes to the city and has to compete with his city cousin. This condition should not exist. I believe that a strong organization of our boys in agriculture would help them to overcome this handicap. Let's form an organization that will give them a greater opportunity for self-expression and for the development of leadership. In this way they will develop confidence in their own ability and pride in the fact that they are farm boys." Groseclose died on June 4, 1950. In 2002, the Department of Historic Resources established a marker in Mr. Groseclose's honor. It is Marker number KC-5 and it is displayed in Bland County of Ceres, Virginia.

== Time line ==
- 1892 Born
- 1917 Completed junior college degree
- 1925 Established the FFV
- 1926 Formal ceremony written
- 1928 Formation of the National FFA Organization
- 1928-1930 Service as National FFA Executive Secretary
- 1930-1941 Service as National FFA Treasurer
- 1950 Death
