= John Gragg =

American football coach

Coaching career (HC unless noted)
- 1978: McPherson

Head coaching record
- Overall: 5–4

John Gragg is an American former football coach. He was the head football coach at McPherson College in McPherson, Kansas, serving for one season, in 1978, and compiling a record of 5–4.

== Head coaching record ==
| Year | Team | Overall | Conference | Standing | Bowl/playoffs |
|---|---|---|---|---|---|
McPherson Bulldogs (Kansas Collegiate Athletic Conference) (1978)
| 1978 | McPherson | 5–4 | 5–3 | T–3rd | |
| McPherson: | | 5–4 | 5–3 | | |
| Total: | | 5–4 | | | |
