= Floyd Mishler =

American football coach (1893 – 1973)

Biographical details
- Born: September 23, 1893; Kansas, U.S.
- Died: July 19, 1973 (aged 79); California, U.S.

Coaching career (HC unless noted)
- 1923–1924: McPherson

Head coaching record
- Overall: 9–7–2

Floyd Ernest Mishler (September 23, 1893 – July 19, 1973) was an American football coach and physical education advocate. He was the head football coach at McPherson College in McPherson, Kansas, serving for two seasons, from 1923 to 1924, and compiling a record of 9–7–2. He later worked as a high school physical education instructor in California.

== Head coaching record ==
Year	Team	Overall	Conference	Standing	Bowl/playoffs
McPherson Bulldogs (Kansas Collegiate Athletic Conference) (1923–1924)
1923	McPherson	6–2–1	6–2–1	T–4th	
1924	McPherson	3–5–1	3–5–1	T–11th	
McPherson:		9–7–2	9–7–2		
Total:		9–7–2			
