= W. E. Daniel =

American football coach

Coaching career (HC unless noted)
- 1920: McPherson

Head coaching record
- Overall: 5–3–3

W. E. Daniel was an American football coach. He served as head football coach at McPherson College in McPherson, Kansas, serving for one season, in 1920, and compiling a record of 5–3–3.
