= Stephen Fox (disambiguation) =

Stephen Fox (1627–1716) was a British politician

Stephen Fox may also refer to:

- Stephen Fox (clarinet maker), British clarinetist, saxophonist and clarinet maker
- Stephen Fox, 2nd Baron Holland (1745–1774), British politician and peer
- Stephen Fox-Strangways, 1st Earl of Ilchester (1704–1776), British peer and Member of Parliament
- Stephen Fox, pen name for American screenplay and newspaper writer Jules Furthman (1888–1966)

== See also ==
- Steve Fox (disambiguation)
- Steven Fox, conductor
- Steven Fox (golfer), golfer
