= Winifred Starr Dobyns =

American suffragist

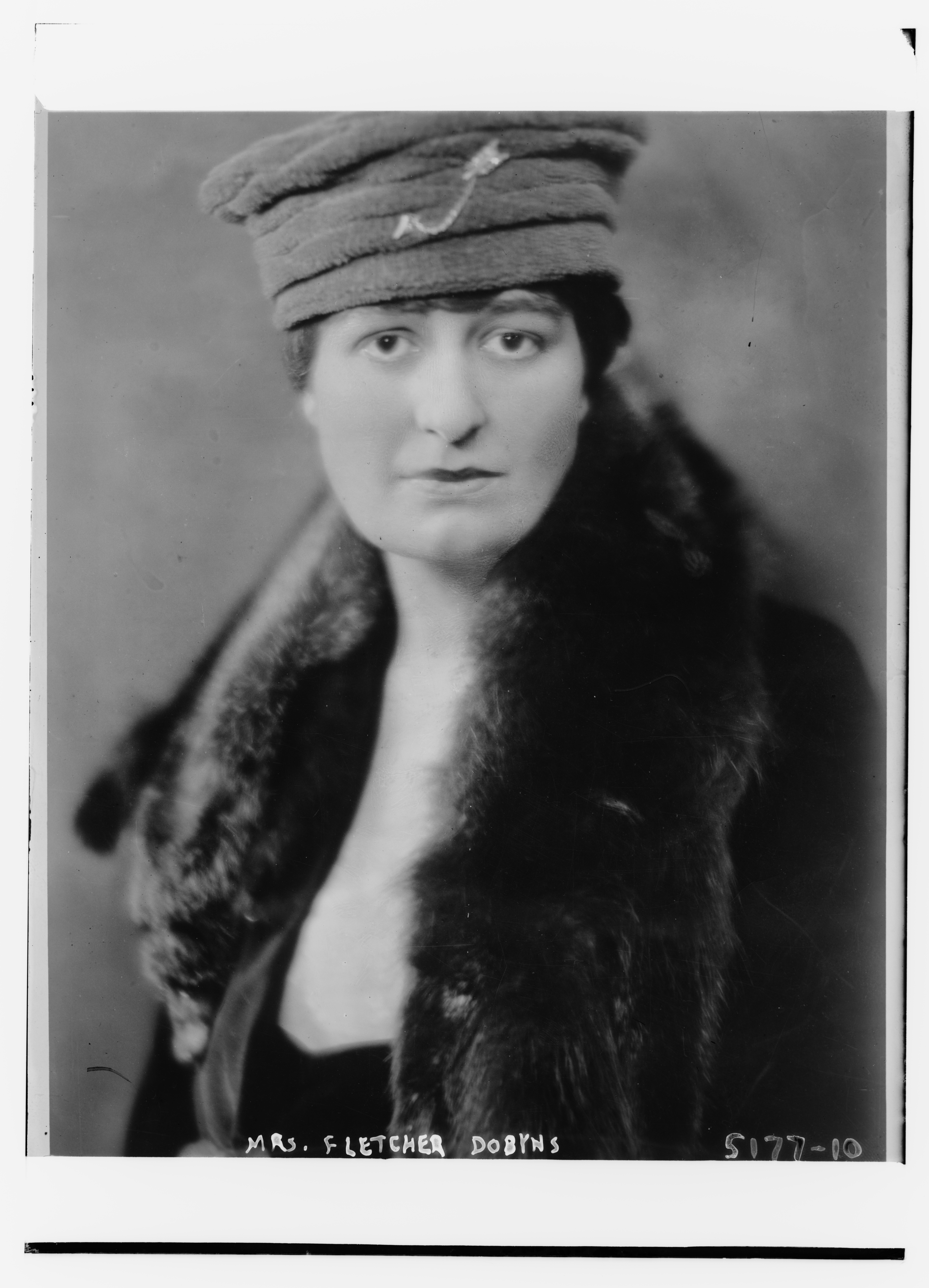
- Winifred Starr Dobyns in the 1910s, from the Library of Congress
- Born: October 21, 1886; Cook County, Illinois
- Died: December 30, 1963 (aged 77); Duarte, California
- Occupations: Suffragist, landscape designer

Winifred Starr Dobyns (October 21, 1886 – December 30, 1963) was an American suffragist and landscape designer.

== Early life ==
Winifred Ursula Starr was born in Chicago, Illinois, the daughter of Merritt Starr and Leila Whadock Starr. Her father was a lawyer. She got married in Christ Church Winnetka to attorney Fletcher Dobyns.

== Career ==
Dobyns became chair of the Illinois Republican Women's executive committee in July 1919. She was in charge of the women's division of the 1920 presidential campaign of Frank Orren Lowden. She attended the celebration and convention of the National American Woman Suffrage Association in Chicago that year. In 1927 she wrote "The Lady and the Tiger (or, the Woman Voter and the Political Machine)", in which she described the place of new women voters in party politics. "With some possible exceptions, the aim of the political organizations is not good government, patriotic service, public welfare," she explained, concluding that "the political machine is the greatest menace to democracy that exists today."

Dobyns worked as a landscape designer in Pasadena, and lectured on gardens. She was the author of California Gardens (1931), which is considered a valuable photographic source in California architectural history. "The text by Mrs. Dobyns sketches the rise and growing interest in gardening and shows the historical background underlying California garden art," noted a reviewer in 1932.

== Personal life ==
In 1909, Winifred Starr married lawyer and writer Fletcher Dobyns. After 1932, they lived in an estate in Pasadena overlooking the Rose Bowl. Her husband died in 1942, and she died in 1963, at a retirement home in Duarte, California, aged 77 years.
