= Jeff Allen (comedian) =

American comedian (born 1956)

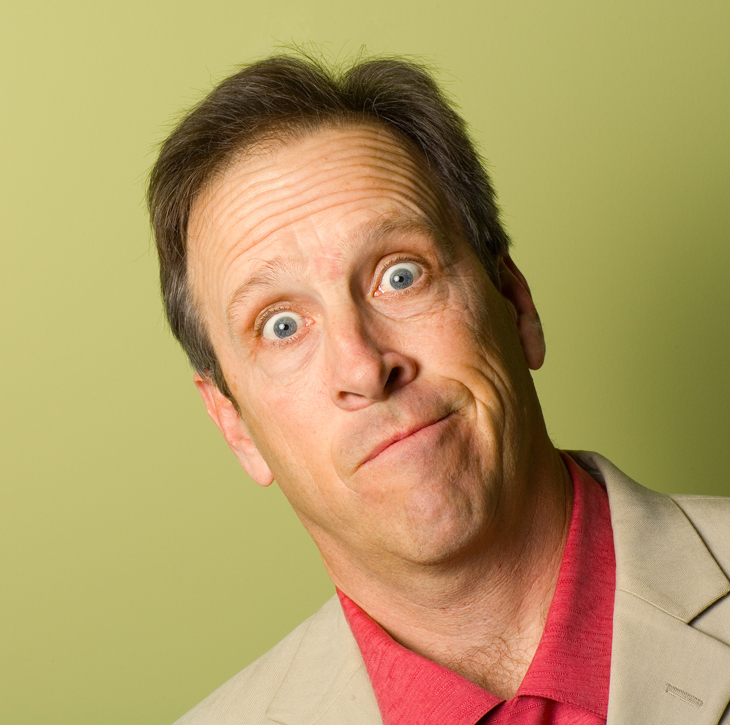
- Born: Jeffrey Allen Mishler; June 5, 1956 (age 70); Sauk Village, Illinois, U.S.
- Spouse: Tami Mishler

Comedy career
- Years active: 1978–present
- Medium: Film, Comedy, Stand Up, Public Speaker
- Website: https://www.jeffallencomedy.com

Jeffrey Allen Mishler (born June 5, 1956), known professionally as Jeff Allen, is an American comedian best known for his film Happy Wife, Happy Life, Revisited. He is also known for his starring roles in several full-length comedy films, including: Bananas, Thou Shalt Laugh, Apostles of Comedy, and Apostles of Comedy: Onwards and Upwards.

== Early life ==
Jeffrey Allen Mishler was born on June 5, 1956 in Sauk Village, Illinois. Allen's father, Jack Mishler, aspired to be a painter but could only support his family as a construction worker. His mother, Arlene Mishler, worked for 30 years at Stauffer Chemical Company.

== Early career ==
Allen began his career in 1978 in the comedy clubs of Chicago. Humiliated by the low pay and lack of respect, Allen, then a self-declared atheist, turned to drugs and alcohol. In 1987 he got sober and in 1997 he became a born-again Christian. As he worked clean, in the style of Bill Cosby and Jerry Seinfeld, churches became a significant venue for his act.

== Personal life ==
He resides in Fairview, Tennessee with his wife Tami and two children (his wife has one additional child from a previous marriage). His older son served with the 101st Airborne in Iraq.
