= New Farmers of America =

Historical organization for Black youth

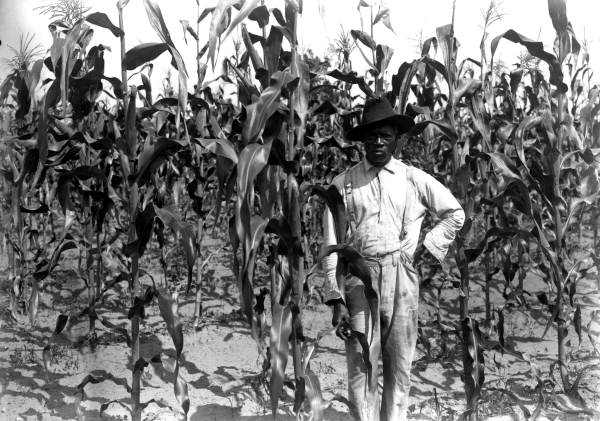
African-American man standing in a field of corn in Florida

The New Farmers of America (NFA) was organized in Tuskegee, Alabama and became a national organization for African-American young men in 1935. The organization was formed to serve agriculture students in southern states where schools were segregated by law.

NFA Emblem from 4 August, 1935 until FFA-NFA merger in 1965

Much like the National FFA Organization (FFA), NFA sought to provide young men with vocational, social and recreational activities in order to develop their skills in public speaking, leadership and agricultural trades.

In 1941, the Department of Education moved the NFA under its administration, and by 1965 the NFA was completely absorbed by the FFA.

== About the NFA ==
NFA stands for New Farmers of America. It was created to provide African-American boys with vocational agriculture opportunities. Similar to FFA, the student-led organization promoted leadership and practical skill development in the agricultural sciences.

== Beginnings ==
In 1927, Dr. H.O. Sargent Sargent, the first federal agent of vocational agricultural education for special groups (which included Black, Hispanic and Native Americans) teamed up with G.W. Owens, a teacher- trainer at Virginia State College draft the first constitution and bylaws. That same year, 400 New Farmers of Virginia members from 18 chapters held a state rally to create more interest in the vocation of farming, encourage cooperative effort among agricultural students and develop rural leadership.

From 1927 to 1935, plans for the national NFA organization took shape and it was officially formed Aug. 4, 1935, at Tuskegee Institute in Tuskegee, Alabama.

NFA operated autonomously from its inception in 1935 until 1941. During this time, NFA grew to consist of 1,004 chapters in 12 states and more than 50,000 members.

== Aim and Purpose ==
The specific purposes were as follows:

1. To develop competent, aggressive, agricultural and rural leadership.
2. To encourage intelligent choice of farming occupations.
3. To encourage members in the development of individual farming programs.
4. To encourage members to improve the home, the farm and surroundings.
5. To participate in worthy undertakings for the improvement of agriculture.
6. To practice and encourage thrift.
7. To develop character, train for useful citizenship, and foster patriotism.
8. To participate in a cooperative effort.
9. To provide and encourage the development of organized rural recreational activities.
10. To strengthen confidence of farm boys and young men in themselves and their work.
11. To encourage improvement in scholarship
12. To create and nurture a love of country life.

== Creed ==
The creed:

I believe in the dignity of farm work and that I shall prosper in proportion as I learn to put knowledge and skill into the occupations of farming.

I believe that the farm boy who learns to produce better crops and better livestock; who learns to improve and beautify his home surroundings will find joy and success in meeting the challenging situations as they arise in his daily living.

I believe that rural organizations should develop their leaders from within; that the boys in the rural communities should look forward to positions of leadership in the civic, social and public life surrounding them.

I believe that the life of service is the life that counts; that happiness endures to mankind when it comes from having helped lift the burdens of others.

I believe in the practice of cooperation in agriculture; that it will aid in bringing to the man lowest down a wealth of giving as well as receiving.

I believe that each farm boy bears the responsibility for finding and developing his talents to the end that the life of his people may thereby be enriched so that happiness and contentment will come to all.

== Emblem ==
The NFA emblem was made up of five symbols:

1. plow representing tillage of the soil
2. owl representing wisdom
3. rising sun representing progress
4. open boll of cotton with two leaves attached to its base representing the important economic agricultural interest of many members
5. American eagle with shield, arrows, and an olive branch representing the wide scope of the organization.
