= Harry Sanders =

Australian entrepreneur

Harry Sanders Harry Sanders
- Known for: Founder, StudioHawk
- Website: harrysanders.com

Harry Sanders is an Australian entrepreneur. He grew up in Melbourne, Australia and at the age of 13, he taught himself search engine optimization in order to help his father's small business. At the age of 17, he founded the SEO firm StudioHawk. He grew the company to more than 80 employees by 2023, becoming the largest SEO firm in Australia.

Sanders later became a board member of Australian Web Industry Association. He is also an advocate for the homeless, being one himself as a teenager. He is also an ambassador for the Lighthouse Foundation.
