= McSpadden Hollow =

Valley in Missouri, United States

Coordinates: 36.918386°N 90.989571°W

McSpadden Hollow is a valley in Carter County in the U.S. state of Missouri.

McSpadden Hollow was named after Frank McSpadden, the proprietor of a local sawmill.
