= Don Rominger =

American football coach, track coach, university administrator

Biographical details
- Born: February 27, 1940; Shawnee, Oklahoma, U.S.

Coaching career (HC unless noted)

Football
- 1968–1971: NE Oklahoma A&M (assistant)
- 1973–1977: McPherson

Track
- 1968–1971: NE Oklahoma A&M

Head coaching record
- Overall: 11–34–2 (college football)

Donald William Rominger Jr. (born February 27, 1940) is an American former university administrator and football and track coach. He served as the head football coach at McPherson College in McPherson, Kansas for five seasons, from 1973 to 1977, and for two years as head track coach and athletics director, compiling a football coaching record of 11–34–2. His 1976 McPherson mark of 5 wins and 4 losses was the college's first winning football season in 18 years.

Rominger began his career as a teacher in a two-room school near Tecumseh, Oklahoma, followed by a six-year career as a high school track and football coach. In 1966, he was the track coach at Miami High School in Miami, Oklahoma, where he mentored future Heisman Trophy-winner Steve Owens. From 1968 to 1971, Rominger was a member of the faculty at Northeastern Oklahoma A&M College in Miami, Oklahoma, where was also head track coach and an assistant football coach.

Donald W. (Don) Rominger Jr. was born in Shawnee, Oklahoma, the son of Donald W. and Winnie Townsend Rominger. He moved with his family in 1951 to a farm east of Tecumseh, Oklahoma and graduated from Tecumseh High School in 1958. He earned an undergraduate degree at Oklahoma Baptist University, a master's degree from the University of Oklahoma, and, in 1976, a Ph.D. in history from Oklahoma State University.

Rominger in 2000 was instrumental for beginning the football program at East Texas Baptist University while serving as vice president for academic affairs. He previously had established the fund raising arm for athletics in 1985 and founded the ETBU athletic hall of fame in 1988. In 2021, Rominger was inducted into the university's athletic hall of fame. Rominger in 2008 was the Republican Party candidate for State Senate in his district.

== Head coaching record ==
Year	Team	Overall	Conference	Standing	Bowl/playoffs
McPherson Bulldogs (Kansas Collegiate Athletic Conference) (1973–1977)
1973	McPherson	2–8	2–6	T–7th	
1974	McPherson	2–7	2–6	T–7th	
1975	McPherson	2–7–1	2–5–1	7th	
1976	McPherson	5-4	5-3	2nd (tie)	
1977	McPherson	0–8–1	0–7–1	9th	
McPherson:		11–34–2	11–28–2		
Total:		11–34–2			
