= The Unaccountability Machine =

2024 book by Dan Davies

- Author: Dan Davies
- Language: English
- Subject: Business
- Published: 2024
- Publisher: Profile Books
- Publication place: United States

The Unaccountability Machine (2024) is a business book by Dan Davies, an investment bank analyst and author, who also writes for The New Yorker. It argues that responsibility for decision-making has become diffused after World War II, and that this represents a flaw in society.

== Synopsis ==
The book explores industrial-scale decision-making in markets, institutions and governments, a situation where the system serves itself by following process instead of logic. Davies argues that unexpected consequences, unwanted outcomes or failures emerge from "responsibility voids" that are built into underlying systems. These voids are especially visible in big complex organizations.

Davies introduces the term “accountability sinks”, which remove the ownership or responsibility for decisions made. The sink obscures or deflects responsibility, and contributes towards a set of outcomes that appear to have been generated by a black box. Whether a rule book, best practices, or computer system, these accountability sinks "scramble feedback" and make it difficult to identify the source of mistakes and rectify them. An accountability sink breaks the links between decision makers and individuals, thus preventing feedback from being shared as a result of the system malfunction. The end result, he argues, is protocol politics, where there is no head, or accountability. Decision makers can avoid the blame for their institutional actions, while the ordinary customer, citizen or employee face the consequences of these managers' poor decision making.

The book draws heavily on the work of Stafford Beer, his Viable System Model (VSM), and Cybernetics more generally, which Davies posits as a forgotten discipline. Beer's experiences in Chile, implementing the VSM as part of Salvador Allende's attempt to manage a socialist economy, known as Project Cybersyn, are discussed in some detail. He positions a Cybernetic approach based on feedback and viability against the reductive approach of Friedmanite economics. The book ends with reading recommendations many of which are editions of Beer's work, or about his life and thought.

== Publication and reception ==
It was published by Profile Books in 2024, with the full title The Unaccountability Machine: Why Big Systems Make Terrible Decisions—and How the World Lost Its Mind. It was noted by the Financial Times as a "must read" book in 2024. It was also reviewed in The Guardian.
