= Harry Stine (businessman) =

Agricultural seed magnate

- Born: 1941 or 1942 (age 84–85)
- Education: McPherson College (BA)
- Known for: Founder and owner of Stine Seed; Owner of International Oilseed Distributors, Inc.
- Spouse: Molly
- Children: 4
- Website: Official website

Harry H. Stine (born 1941/1942) is an American billionaire businessman, the founder and owner of Stine Seed. In 2025, Stine had an estimated net worth of US$9.9 billion.

== Early life ==
He is the son of Bill and Roselba Stine. In 1871, his great-grandparents, William and Sarah Stine arrived in Adel, Iowa, from Pennsylvania, and established a 160-acre farm there. In 1894, his grandfather Ira Cloyd Stine married Lydia Sheaffer and they had had four children, all sons. Everyone worked for I.C Stine and Sons until after World War II. In 1934, Bill and Roselba Stine moved to the 200-acre farm that would become Stine Seed Farm, which was founded in the 1950s.

== Career ==
He made his fortune licensing soybean and corn genetics to Syngenta, Monsanto, and other agribusiness giants.

He is Iowa's richest man and as of 2020, the state's only billionaire.

Owning nearly 15,000 acres of land in Iowa through his private ownership of Stine Seed, Harry Stine is Iowa's largest land owner.

In 2018, he was listed as the wealthiest in Iowa with a net worth of $3.2 billion by Forbes. In 2019, he increased his fortune by $1.8 billion to $5 billion ranking him the richest Iowan and #131 richest in the United States by Forbes. In 2020, his net worth was estimated at $5.7 billion by Forbes, ranking him the richest Iowan and #484 richest in the world.

== Personal life ==
Stine is dyslexic and moderately autistic. He is married, with four children.

As a registered Republican, he did not support Donald Trump during 2020 elections but favored Elizabeth Warren in the 2020 Iowa Democratic caucuses.
