= Stine Seed =

Seed company from Adel, Iowa, U.S.

Stine Seed Company
- Company type: private
- Industry: seeds
- Founded: 1950s
- Headquarters: Adel, Iowa, US
- Products: soybean and corn genetics
- Owners: Harry Stine and his four children
- Website: www.stineseed.com

Stine Seed Company is the world's largest private seed company, and the largest independent seed company in the US. It has more than 900 patents, specializing in soybean and corn genetics, is based in the small town of Adel, Iowa, and is almost entirely owned by Harry Stine and his four children.

== History ==
Stine Seed Company was founded by Harry Stine's father in the 1950s as Stine Seed Farm.

In 1997, they entered into a large-scale collaboration with Monsanto, focusing on increasing corn and soybean yields.

In 2014, Forbes estimated that the company was worth almost US$3 billion, with estimated sales of over $1 billion and margins over 10%.

In fall 2017 with U.S. President Donald Trump and general secretary of the Chinese Communist Party Xi Jinping in attendance, Stine Seed's China subsidiary Stine Seed China signed a $10 million deal with Beijing W. Seed through the China Iowa Group allowing China much greater access to seed technology.

In 2018, a lawsuit was filed against the company by a group of black farmers who allege that they were deliberately sold inferior seeds. The seeds sold to them were certified to be genetically pure and have a near 100% germination rate, but testing done by the Mississippi State Seed Testing Laboratory indicates that the seeds sold to the farmers had a 0% germination rate. In a statement responding to the lawsuit, the company declared the lawsuit is "without merit and factually unsupportable". The company has conducted an internal investigation which they claim has found no evidence of the claims brought in the lawsuit. The suit was dismissed in 2020.

== Operations ==
It is the world's largest private seed company, has 15,000 acres of Iowa farmland and is almost entirely owned by Harry Stine and his four children. Stine has nearly 400 employees in 16 states, and 500 globally.

According to Harry Stine, his children are active in Stine Seed with his eldest Lucinda crossing soybeans, Myron in charge of the Brand, Warren as the liaison between marketing and research, and Brenda as a part-time attorney with Stine Seed.

== Products and patents ==
The company has over 900 patents, specialising in soybean and corn genetics. Customers include Monsanto and Syngenta. Stine Seed have developed high-density corn varieties, with shorted plants but planted 8-12 inches apart, rather than 42 inches apart when horses were used, allowing for average yields of up to 300 bushels per acre. Stine Seed was hoping to get approval to sell their seeds in China in 2015. They have been partnering with Chinese firms for a few years.
