= McPherson Bulldogs =

- University: McPherson College
- Nickname: Bulldogs
- NAIA: Region IV
- Conference: KCAC (primary)
- Athletic director: Josh Daume
- Location: McPherson, Kansas
- Varsity teams: 18
- Football stadium: McPherson Stadium
- Basketball arena: Holman Fieldhouse
- Colors: Red and white
- Mascot: Ben the Bulldog
- Website: macbulldogs.com
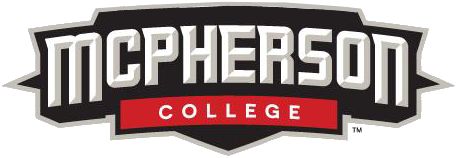

The McPherson Bulldogs are the athletic teams that represent McPherson College, located in McPherson, Kansas, in intercollegiate sports as a member of the National Association of Intercollegiate Athletics (NAIA), primarily competing in the Kansas Collegiate Athletic Conference (KCAC) since the 1902–03 academic year. Their athletic team colors are red and white, with black being used as a complementary color in logos and uniforms.

== Varsity teams ==
McPherson competes in 16 intercollegiate varsity sports:

Men's sports	Women's sports
Baseball	Basketball
Basketball	Bowling
Cross country	Cross country
Football	Soccer
Soccer	Softball
Tennis	Tennis
Track and field	Track and field
	Volleyball
Co-ed sports
Shotgun

=== Football ===
Recent times has brought a level of success to the Bulldog football program. The team completed the 2009 year with a record of 9 wins and 2 losses (8-1 in conference play) with a second-place finish in the conference and post-season playoff appearance for the first time.

School records of the program go back to 1920, but other records show a player named Pop Hollinger played football for McPherson in 1917 or earlier. It is possible that records are incorrect, incomplete, or that there was no official coach before the 1920 season.

The first paid coach for the program that the school has on record was W. E. Daniel in 1920, who posted a record of 5–3–3. Other coaches included Woody Woodard (1950–1952), Don Rominger (1973–1977), Dan Thiessen (1986–1992), and Pete Sterbick.

== Facilities ==
Venue	Sport(s)	Open.	Ref.
McPherson Stadium	Football; Soccer; Track and field	1950	
Holman Fieldhouse	Basketball; Volleyball	1982	
Bulldog Park	Baseball; Softball	2018	
Bulldog Tennis Center	Tennis	n/i	
Grass Practice Fields	Football; Soccer; Track and field	2013	
