= McPherson College =

Brethren college in McPherson, Kansas, US

Coordinates: 38°22′18″N 97°38′32″W

- Type: Private college
- Established: 1887; 139 years ago
- Religious affiliation: Church of the Brethren
- Endowment: $61.8 million (2025)
- President: Michael Schneider
- Provost: Amanda Gutierrez (Executive Vice President)
- Faculty: 40
- Administrative staff: 90
- Undergraduates: 811
- Location: McPherson, Kansas, United States
- Campus: 23 acres (9.3 ha)
- Colors: Red and white
- Nickname: Bulldogs
- Sporting affiliations: NAIA
- Mascot: Ben the Bulldog
- Website: mcpherson.edu
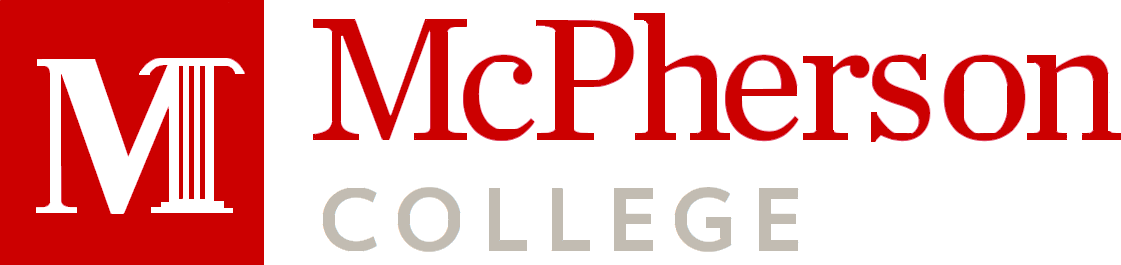

McPherson College is a private college associated with the Church of the Brethren and located in McPherson, Kansas, United States. It was chartered in 1887 and is accredited by the Higher Learning Commission.

== History ==
During their 1887 annual meeting, the Church of the Brethren recognized the need for a college west of the Mississippi River to serve the educational desires of settlers moving westward. The first academic semester opened on 5 September 1888, with 60 students and a faculty of seven. The dormitory, a single building which served as residence hall, college, and library had been constructed before the semester began. By the end of the first school year nearly 200 students had enrolled and the foundation had been laid for the main building. In 1898, Sharp Hall was completed, though it had been used for school purposes for some time while still incomplete. On 12 February 1898, the school was officially christened McPherson College.

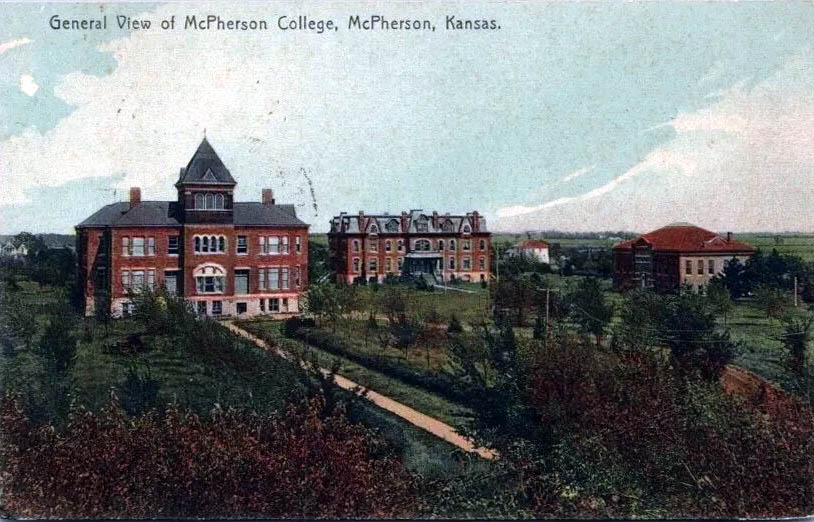
View of the college in 1908

In 1926, J Willard Hershey synthesized one of the world's earliest synthetic (man-made) diamonds on the McPherson College campus. One of the diamonds is on display at the McPherson Museum in McPherson, Kansas. There is some debate about the success of Hershey's experiments, and whether or not true diamonds were involved.

In 1962, McPherson College became a charter member of Brethren Colleges Abroad (BCA).

In 1976, local entrepreneur Gaines H. "Smokey" Billue, provided funds for the construction of Templeton Hall along with additional operating capital through the donation of a portion of his classic and antique car collection. This donation provided the spark to launch the Automotive Restoration Technology program at McPherson College. The Tonight Show host Jay Leno has been a financial supporter of the Automotive Restoration Technology program since 1997 and a member of the program's National Advisory Board since 1998.

In November 2022, an anonymous donor promised to deliver $2 for every $1 raised by McPherson College up to a maximum gift of $500 million. By June 30th, the final day of the matching period, the college had secured $342 million in outside pledges which enable them to receive the full amount of the initial donation. The anonymous donor then pledged an additional $500 million estate gift to the college. This resulted in the McPherson endowment growing to $1.59 billion, making it one of the largest endowments of a small liberal arts college in the United States.

== Academics ==
Three out of four of the faculty hold terminal degrees. Twenty three hold PhDs. All of the arts faculty hold the degree of Master of Fine Arts or higher. The remainder hold non-terminal degrees. McPherson College has a 13/1 student-faculty ratio.

Freshman and Sophomore seminars

Academic Community Essentials (known as ACE) is the name of McPherson's First Year Experience program. Freshmen must enroll in the course in both the fall and spring semesters of their first year. The goals for the course are for students to learn about college life, create a degree plan, and practice good study skills, critical thinking, and conflict resolution.

Sophomores must enroll in one semester of Sophomore Seminar. The course goals for sophomores include completing a service project, developing a career plan, and exploring internship options.

=== Automotive Restoration Technology ===
McPherson College offers the only four-year Bachelor of Science degree in Automotive Restoration Technology in the United States. The program focuses on the complete restoration of valuable, classic, and antique automobiles built from 1886 to 1970.

The restoration technical disciplines include research, documentation, automotive history, historical design, technical drawing and CAD, metal shaping, welding, body and paint, engine rebuilding, machining, applied diagnostics, chassis rebuilding, drivetrain rebuilding, final assembly, electricity and electronics, technical woodworking, materials engineering, foundry, and trim and upholstery.

The courses are conducted at Templeton Hall, a 33,000 square feet (3,100 m^{2}) facility, which houses a combination of traditional classrooms and large work spaces including a metals lab, trim and upholstery lab, wood lab, machine lab, engines lab, chassis lab, assembly lab, paint lab, foundry, and motorcycle lab.

There are eight scholarships offered exclusively to Automotive Restoration students. The most famous are the Fred Duesenberg Memorial Scholarship endowed by Jay Leno and Peter Heydon, and the Pebble Beach Concours d'Elegance Scholarship in honor of Phil Hill endowed by the Pebble Beach Company Foundation and Pebble Beach Concours d'Elegance.

=== Entrepreneurship program ===
McPherson College recently added an interdisciplinary entrepreneurship program. The slogan for the program is "Freedom to Jump" and was developed by students in a communication course. The program has four different components. The program is led by the Vice President for Entrepreneurship and Innovation.

Transformative Entrepreneurship Minor

Students in any major may take the Transformative Entrepreneurship Minor. Coursework for the minor is completed in four departments: Entrepreneurship, Humanities, Social Sciences, and Science & Technology.

Global Enterprise Challenge

Students have the option to form teams and compete in the Global Enterprise Challenge. Teams create a plan to meet a need in a country that is selected and announced each fall. The students present their plans to a committee of faculty members. The winning team travels to the country the following summer. In 2011 the Challenge country was Haiti and in 2012 it was Panama.

Horizon and Opportunity Funds

McPherson College has two grant funds to support entrepreneurial projects by students, faculty, and staff. Students apply to the Horizon Fund and faculty and staff to the Opportunity Fund. Winning student plans have included a campus community garden, college prep summer camp for middle school students, a sundry and snack shop on campus, a baking business, and a photography studio specializing in photos of vintage cars.

Jump Start Kansas

McPherson College offers entrepreneurship grants and scholarships for high school students in Kansas. Students compete by presenting plans to a committee of faculty and administration members. There are two winners, one in the category of commercial projects and one in the category of social projects.

=== Milwaukee Center ===
The college operates a satellite in Milwaukee, Wisconsin. The Milwaukee Center offers short courses which are designed for K-12 educators who already have a bachelor's degree.

=== Graduate courses in education ===
In the fall of 2012, McPherson College started offering graduate courses in education. This program is designed to become the foundation for a master's degree in the Arts of Teaching and is pending accreditation from the Higher Learning Commission. As of the fall of 2012, three regional school districts had endorsed the graduate courses for their teachers. The program requires 35 credit hours of requirements and electives. Through a partnership agreement, these courses may also be used toward the Educational Leadership program at Fort Hays State University.

== Campus ==
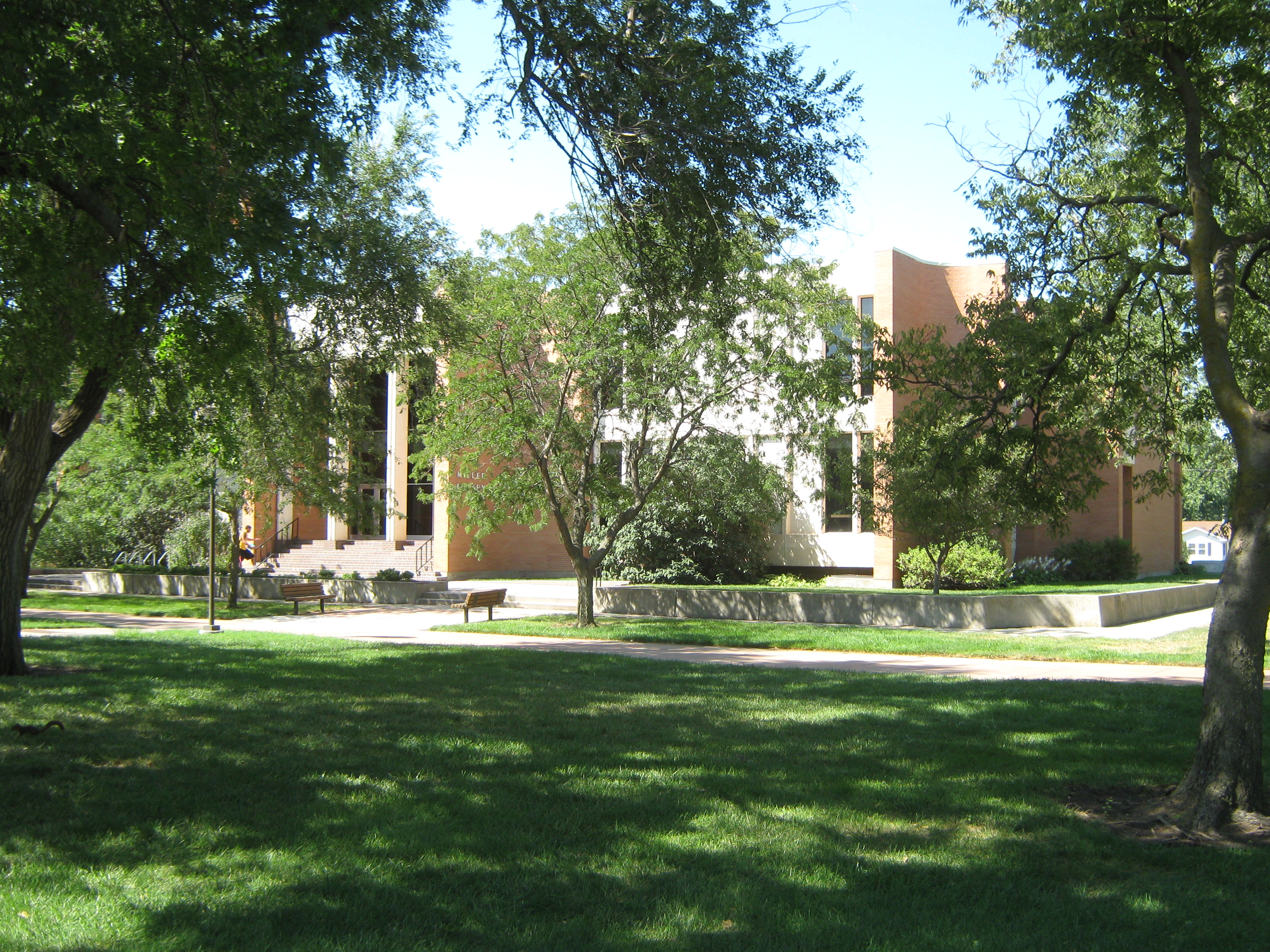
Miller Library (2011)

The present campus has sixteen major buildings on 23 acres (9.3 ha) of land. The college's campus is located on the east side of the city of McPherson. There are five instructional buildings and two administration buildings. Miller Library serves the entire campus population and houses the college archives, academic support services and career services. Students living on campus live in one of the seven residential halls. There are two male dormitories, one female dormitory, and one co-ed dormitory. In addition, there are two co-ed apartment style dormitories. Hoffman Student Union houses the dining hall, bookstore, and mail center. The Sports Center contains all of the coaches' offices and locker rooms. Outdoor field sports are played at McPherson Stadium. In the summer of 2012 the stadium was renovated and two large practice fields were added to the campus.

== Student life ==
In 2022 there were 810 students enrolled in McPherson College. The population is 64% male and 36% female. Among the student body, 63% identify as white and 28% identify as minorities. The majority of the students (95%) are considered traditional. Students from Kansas constitute 44%, out of state are 51%. The 1% of international students come from six countries.

The Student Government Association is led by a president and chief of staff. There are representatives elected from each academic year and each of the residence halls.

== Athletics ==
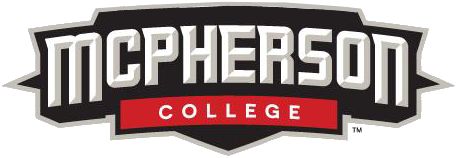
McPherson athletics wordmark

The McPherson athletic teams are called the Bulldogs. The college is a member of the National Association of Intercollegiate Athletics (NAIA), primarily competing in the Kansas Collegiate Athletic Conference (KCAC) since the 1902–03 academic year. Their athletic team colors are red and white, with black being used as a complementary color in logos and uniforms.

McPherson competes in 18 intercollegiate varsity sports: Men's sports include baseball, basketball, cross country, football, soccer, tennis and track & field; while women's sports include basketball, cross country, soccer, softball, tennis, track & field and volleyball; and co-ed sports include competitive cheer, competitive dance and shotgun sports.

== Notable alumni and faculty ==
- Jonathan Coachman – former ESPN personality; former All-Conference Kansas Collegiate Athletic Conference (KCAC) basketball player; former WWE (World Wrestling Entertainment) announcer
- Harvey Harlow Nininger (class of 1914) – meteorite collector, self-taught meteorologist, educator; considered by many today to be the "father of modern meteoritics"
- Duane Earl Pope – convicted bank robber and murderer; briefly on the FBI Ten Most Wanted Fugitives list
- Harry Stine – billionaire businessman; founder and owner of Stine Seed
