= List of Ottawa Braves head football coaches =

The Ottawa Braves program is a college football team that represents Ottawa University in the Kansas Collegiate Athletic Conference, a part of the NAIA. The team has had 29 head coaches since its first recorded football game in 1901. The current coach is Nick Davis who first took the position for the 2022 season.

== Key ==
Key to symbols in coaches list
General		Overall		Conference		Postseason (Note: Although the first Rose Bowl Game was played in 1902, it has been continuously played since the 1916 game, and is recognized as the oldest bowl game by the NCAA. "—" indicates any season prior to 1916 when postseason games were not played.)	
No.	Order of coaches (Note: A running total of the number of head coaches, with coaches who served separate tenures being counted only once. Interim head coaches are represented with "Int" and are not counted in the running total. "—" indicates the team played but either without a coach or no coach is on record. "X" indicates an interim year without play.)	GC	Games coached	CW	Conference wins	PW	Postseason wins
DC	Division championships	OW	Overall wins	CL	Conference losses	PL	Postseason losses
CC	Conference championships	OL	Overall losses	CT	Conference ties	PT	Postseason ties
NC	National championships	OT	Overall ties (Note: Overtime rules in college football were introduced in 1996, making ties impossible in the period since.)	C%	Conference winning percentage		
†	Elected to the College Football Hall of Fame	O%	Overall winning percentage (Note: When computing the win–loss percentage, a tie counts as half a win and half a loss.)				

== Coaches ==
No.	Name	Term	GC	OW	OL	OT	O%	CW	CL	CT	C%	PW	PL	CCs	Awards
1	J. Nort Atkinson	1901–1902	19	12	5	2	.684	—	—	—	—	—	—	—	—
X	No team	1903	-	-	-	-	-	-	-	-	-—	-	-	-	-
2	Alpha Brumage	1904–1907	31	14	16	1	.468	—	—	—	—	—	—	—	—
3	Norman G. Wann	1908–1909	15	9	5	1	.633	—	—	—	—	—	—	—	—
4	Oscar Dahlene	1910	6	2	3	1	.417	—	—	—	—	—	—	—	—
5	Red Baughman	1911	7	1	3	3	.357	—	—	—	—	—	—	—	—
6	Floyd Daniel Hargiss	1912	7	0	7	0	.000	—	—	—	—	—	—	—	—
7	Porter Craig	1913–1914	13	5	6	2	.462	—	—	—	—	—	—	—	—
8	Arthur Schabinger	1915–1917; 1919	30	9	17	4	.367	—	—	—	—	—	—	—	—
X	No team	1918	-	-	-	-	-	-	-	-	-—	-	-	-	-
9	Robert E. Brannan	1920–1922	23	2	20	1	.109	—	—	—	—	—	—	—	—
10	Edwin Elbel	1923–1927	42	14	21	7	.417	—	—	—	—	—	—	—	—
11	Archie W. Butcher	1928–1929	16	2	12	2	.188	—	—	—	—	—	—	—	—
12	John S. Davis	1930	9	1	8	0	.111	—	—	—	—	—	—	—	—
13	Charles Errickson	1931–1935	40	18	21	1	.463	—	—	—	—	—	—	—	—
14	Dick Godlove	1936–1942	56	37	13	6	.714	—	—	—	—	—	—	—	—
X	No team	-	-	-	-	-	-	-	-	-—	-	-	-	-	
15	Wally A. Forsberg	1946–1948	28	20	6	2	.750	—	—	—	—	—	—	—	—
16	Richard Peters	1949–1952; 1957–1971	174	129	42	3	.750	—	—	—	—	—	—	—	—
17	Paul J. Andree	1953–1955	27	12	14	1	.463	—	—	—	—	—	—	—	—
18	Grover Nutt	1956	9	0	9	0	.000	—	—	—	—	—	—	—	—
19	Ben Moor	1972–1975	37	18	19	0	.486	—	—	—	—	—	—	—	—
20	Don McLeary	1976–1977	18	10	8	0	.556	—	—	—	—	—	—	—	—
21	John Salavantis	1978	10	7	3	0	.700	—	—	—	—	—	—	—	—
22	Nyle Salmans	1979–1983	52	24	27	1	.471	—	—	—	—	—	—	—	—
23	Glenn Percy	1984–1988	50	21	29	0	.420	—	—	—	—	—	—	—	—
24	Dave Dallas	1989–1996	78	38	39	1	.494	—	—	—	—	—	—	—	—
25	Chris Creighton	1997–2000	41	32	9	0	.780	—	—	—	—	—	—	—	—
26	Ronnie Jones	2001	10	6	4	0	.600	—	—	—	—	—	—	—	—
27	Patrick Ross	2002–2003	2	14	7	0	.667	14	4	0	.778	—	1	1	—
28	Kent Kessinger	2004–2021	193	108	85	0	.560	96	67	0	.589	2	4	3	—
29	Nick Davis	2022–present	31	9	23	0	.281	9	16	0	.360	-	-	1	—

== See also ==
- List of people from Franklin County, Kansas
