= List of Kansas Collegiate Athletic Conference football standings (1956–1996) =

This is a list of yearly Kansas Collegiate Athletic Conference football standings.

== Kansas Collegiate Athletic Conference standings ==
=== NAIA (1956–1969) ===
1956 Kansas Collegiate Athletic Conference football standings
	Conf.					Overall
Team	W		L		T	W		L		T
Kansas Wesleyan $	7	–	0	–	0	8	–	1	–	0
College of Emporia	6	–	1	–	0	7	–	2	–	0
McPherson	5	–	2	–	0	5	–	4	–	0
Bethel (KS)	4	–	3	–	0	4	–	5	–	0
Baker	3	–	4	–	0	4	–	5	–	0
Friends	2	–	5	–	0	2	–	6	–	1
Bethany (KS)	1	–	6	–	0	1	–	7	–	0
Ottawa	0	–	7	–	0	0	–	9	–	0
$ – Conference champion

1957 Kansas Collegiate Athletic Conference football standings
	Conf.					Overall
Team	W		L		T	W		L		T
Kansas Wesleyan $	6	–	1	–	0	8	–	1	–	0
Baker	5	–	1	–	1	6	–	2	–	1
McPherson	5	–	2	–	0	6	–	3	–	0
Bethel (KS)	5	–	2	–	0	5	–	4	–	0
Ottawa	3	–	4	–	0	4	–	5	–	0
College of Emporia	2	–	4	–	1	2	–	6	–	1
Friends	1	–	6	–	0	1	–	8	–	0
Bethany (KS)	0	–	7	–	0	0	–	8	–	0
$ – Conference champion

1958 Kansas Collegiate Athletic Conference football standings
	Conf.					Overall
Team	W		L		T	W		L		T
Baker $	7	–	0	–	0	8	–	1	–	0
McPherson	6	–	1	–	0	8	–	1	–	0
Ottawa	3	–	3	–	1	3	–	5	–	1
Kansas Wesleyan	3	–	4	–	0	4	–	4	–	1
College of Emporia	3	–	4	–	0	4	–	5	–	0
Bethany (KS)	2	–	4	–	1	3	–	4	–	1
Bethel (KS)	2	–	4	–	1	3	–	5	–	1
Friends	0	–	6	–	1	0	–	8	–	1
$ – Conference champion

1959 Kansas Collegiate Athletic Conference football standings
	Conf.					Overall
Team	W		L		T	W		L		T
College of Emporia $	7	–	0	–	0	9	–	1	–	0
Ottawa	6	–	1	–	0	6	–	3	–	0
Baker	5	–	2	–	0	5	–	4	–	0
Kansas Wesleyan	3	–	3	–	1	3	–	5	–	1
McPherson	3	–	4	–	0	4	–	5	–	0
Bethany (KS)	2	–	4	–	1	4	–	4	–	1
Friends	1	–	6	–	0	1	–	8	–	0
Bethel (KS)	0	–	7	–	0	0	–	9	–	0
$ – Conference champion

1960 Kansas Collegiate Athletic Conference football standings
	Conf.					Overall
Team	W		L		T	W		L		T
Ottawa $	9	–	0	–	0	9	–	0	–	0
Baker	8	–	1	–	0	8	–	1	–	0
Southwestern (KS)	5	–	3	–	1	5	–	3	–	1
College of Emporia	5	–	4	–	0	5	–	4	–	0
Bethany (KS)	4	–	4	–	1	4	–	4	–	1
Bethel (KS)	4	–	4	–	1	4	–	4	–	1
Kansas Wesleyan	4	–	4	–	1	4	–	4	–	1
McPherson	1	–	7	–	1	1	–	7	–	1
Friends	1	–	7	–	1	1	–	8	–	1
Sterling	1	–	8	–	0	1	–	8	–	0
$ – Conference champion

1961 Kansas Collegiate Athletic Conference football standings
	Conf.					Overall
Team	W		L		T	W		L		T
No. 16 Ottawa $	9	–	0	–	0	9	–	0	–	0
College of Emporia	8	–	1	–	0	8	–	1	–	0
Southwestern (KS)	6	–	2	–	1	6	–	2	–	1
Baker	6	–	3	–	0	6	–	3	–	0
Bethany (KS)	3	–	4	–	2	3	–	4	–	2
Kansas Wesleyan	4	–	5	–	0	4	–	5	–	0
Bethel (KS)	3	–	6	–	0	3	–	6	–	0
McPherson	3	–	6	–	0	3	–	6	–	0
Sterling	1	–	8	–	0	1	–	8	–	0
Friends	0	–	8	–	1	0	–	8	–	1
$ – Conference champion; Rankings from NAIA poll

1962 Kansas Collegiate Athletic Conference football standings
	Conf.					Overall
Team	W		L		T	W		L		T
No. 5 College of Emporia $^	9	–	0	–	0	10	–	1	–	0
Baker	8	–	1	–	0	8	–	1	–	0
Ottawa	7	–	2	–	0	8	–	2	–	0
Southwestern (KS)	5	–	4	–	0	5	–	5	–	0
Bethel (KS)	4	–	4	–	1	4	–	4	–	1
Bethany (KS)	4	–	5	–	0	4	–	5	–	0
McPherson	3	–	6	–	0	3	–	6	–	0
Friends	1	–	7	–	1	1	–	7	–	1
Kansas Wesleyan	1	–	7	–	1	1	–	7	–	1
Sterling	1	–	7	–	1	1	–	7	–	1
$ – Conference champion; ^ – NAIA playoff participant; Rankings from NAIA poll

1963 Kansas Collegiate Athletic Conference football standings
	Conf.					Overall
Team	W		L		T	W		L		T
No. 6 College of Emporia $^	9	–	0	–	0	10	–	1	–	0
Ottawa	8	–	1	–	0	9	–	1	–	0
Bethany (KS)	6	–	3	–	0	6	–	3	–	0
Southwestern (KS)	5	–	4	–	0	6	–	4	–	0
Baker	5	–	4	–	0	5	–	4	–	0
Bethel (KS)	4	–	5	–	0	4	–	5	–	0
McPherson	3	–	6	–	0	3	–	6	–	0
Kansas Wesleyan	3	–	6	–	0	3	–	6	–	0
Sterling	2	–	7	–	0	2	–	7	–	0
Friends	0	–	9	–	0	0	–	9	–	0
$ – Conference champion; ^ – NAIA playoff participant; Rankings from NAIA poll

1964 Kansas Collegiate Athletic Conference football standings
	Conf.					Overall
Team	W		L		T	W		L		T
No. 18 Ottawa +	8	–	1	–	0	8	–	1	–	0
Southwestern (KS) +	8	–	1	–	0	8	–	1	–	0
Baker	7	–	2	–	0	7	–	2	–	0
College of Emporia	7	–	2	–	0	7	–	2	–	0
McPherson	4	–	5	–	0	4	–	5	–	0
Bethany (KS)	3	–	6	–	0	3	–	6	–	0
Kansas Wesleyan	3	–	6	–	0	3	–	6	–	0
Bethel (KS)	2	–	7	–	0	2	–	7	–	0
Friends	2	–	7	–	0	2	–	7	–	0
Sterling	1	–	8	–	0	1	–	8	–	0
+ – Conference co-champions; Rankings from NAIA poll

1965 Kansas Collegiate Athletic Conference football standings
	Conf.					Overall
Team	W		L		T	W		L		T
No. 5 Ottawa $	9	–	0	–	0	9	–	0	–	0
Bethany (KS)	7	–	2	–	0	7	–	2	–	0
Baker	6	–	3	–	0	6	–	3	–	0
College of Emporia	5	–	3	–	1	5	–	3	–	1
Southwestern (KS)	5	–	3	–	1	5	–	3	–	1
Friends	4	–	5	–	0	4	–	5	–	0
Kansas Wesleyan	3	–	6	–	0	3	–	6	–	0
Sterling	3	–	6	–	0	3	–	6	–	0
McPherson	2	–	7	–	0	2	–	7	–	0
Bethel (KS)	0	–	9	–	0	0	–	9	–	0
$ – Conference champion; Rankings from NAIA poll

1966 Kansas Collegiate Athletic Conference football standings
	Conf.					Overall
Team	W		L		T	W		L		T
No. 18 College of Emporia +	8	–	1	–	0	8	–	1	–	0
No. 11 Ottawa +	8	–	1	–	0	8	–	1	–	0
Southwestern (KS)	7	–	2	–	0	8	–	2	–	0
Baker	5	–	3	–	1	5	–	3	–	1
Friends	5	–	3	–	1	5	–	3	–	1
Bethany (KS)	4	–	5	–	0	4	–	5	–	0
McPherson	3	–	6	–	0	3	–	6	–	0
Kansas Wesleyan	2	–	7	–	0	2	–	7	–	0
Sterling	2	–	7	–	0	2	–	7	–	0
Bethel (KS)	0	–	9	–	0	0	–	9	–	0
+ – Conference co-champions; Rankings from NAIA poll

1967 Kansas Collegiate Athletic Conference football standings
	Conf.					Overall
Team	W		L		T	W		L		T
No. 15 Southwestern (KS) $	9	–	0	–	0	9	–	0	–	1
Ottawa	8	–	1	–	0	8	–	1	–	0
Baker	6	–	3	–	0	6	–	3	–	0
Kansas Wesleyan	6	–	3	–	0	6	–	3	–	0
College of Emporia	5	–	4	–	0	5	–	4	–	0
Friends	4	–	4	–	1	4	–	4	–	1
Sterling	3	–	5	–	1	3	–	5	–	1
Bethany (KS)	2	–	7	–	0	2	–	7	–	0
Bethel (KS)	1	–	8	–	0	1	–	8	–	0
McPherson	0	–	9	–	0	0	–	9	–	0
$ – Conference champion; Rankings from NAIA poll

1968 Kansas Collegiate Athletic Conference football standings
	Conf.					Overall
Team	W		L		T	W		L		T
Southwestern (KS) $	7	–	1	–	1	7	–	1	–	1
Kansas Wesleyan	7	–	2	–	0	7	–	2	–	0
Friends	6	–	3	–	0	6	–	3	–	0
Ottawa	5	–	4	–	0	5	–	4	–	0
College of Emporia	5	–	4	–	0	5	–	4	–	0
Bethany (KS)	3	–	5	–	1	3	–	5	–	1
Baker	3	–	6	–	0	3	–	6	–	0
Bethel (KS)	3	–	6	–	0	3	–	6	–	0
Sterling	3	–	6	–	0	3	–	6	–	0
McPherson	2	–	7	–	0	2	–	7	–	0
$ – Conference champion

1969 Kansas Collegiate Athletic Conference football standings
	Conf.					Overall
Team	W		L		T	W		L		T
North Division
Kansas Wesleyan xy$	5	–	0	–	0	8	–	2	–	0
Baker	3	–	2	–	0	6	–	3	–	0
Ottawa	3	–	2	–	0	5	–	4	–	0
Bethany	2	–	3	–	0	4	–	5	–	0
Tabor	2	–	3	–	0	2	–	6	–	0
McPherson	0	–	5	–	0	0	–	8	–	0
South Division
St. Mary of the Plains x	5	–	0	–	0	7	–	2	–	0
Southwestern (KS)	3	–	2	–	0	6	–	3	–	0
Sterling y	3	–	2	–	0	5	–	5	–	0
Bethel (KS)	2	–	3	–	0	4	–	5	–	0
Friends	1	–	4	–	0	4	–	4	–	0
College of Emporia	1	–	4	–	0	1	–	7	–	0
Championship: Kansas Wesleyan 34, Sterling 21
$ – Conference champion; x – Division champion/co-champions; y – Championship game participant

=== NAIA Division II (1970–1996) ===
1970 Kansas Collegiate Athletic Conference football standings
	Conf.					Overall
Team	W		L		T	W		L		T
North Division
Ottawa xy$	5	–	0	–	0	7	–	2	–	1
Baker	4	–	1	–	0	4	–	4	–	0
No. 19 Kansas Wesleyan	3	–	2	–	0	7	–	2	–	0
Bethany	2	–	3	–	0	3	–	5	–	1
McPherson	1	–	4	–	0	1	–	8	–	0
Tabor	0	–	5	–	0	2	–	7	–	0
South Division
St. Mary of the Plains xy	4	–	1	–	0	5	–	5	–	0
Friends	3	–	2	–	0	5	–	3	–	1
Southwestern (KS)	3	–	2	–	0	5	–	3	–	1
Bethel (KS)	3	–	2	–	0	4	–	5	–	0
Sterling	2	–	3	–	0	4	–	4	–	1
College of Emporia	0	–	5	–	0	1	–	8	–	0
Championship: Ottawa 14, St. Mary of the Plains 12
$ – Conference champion; x – Division champion/co-champions; y – Championship game participant; Rankings from NAIA Division II poll

1971 Kansas Collegiate Athletic Conference football standings
	Conf.					Overall
Team	W		L		T	W		L		T
No. 6 Kansas Wesleyan $	8	–	0	–	0	8	–	1	–	0
Bethany (KS)	7	–	1	–	0	8	–	2	–	0
Sterling	6	–	2	–	0	7	–	2	–	0
Friends	4	–	3	–	1	4	–	4	–	1
Southwestern (KS)	3	–	5	–	0	4	–	5	–	0
McPherson	3	–	5	–	0	3	–	7	–	0
St. Mary of the Plains	2	–	5	–	1	2	–	7	–	1
Tabor	2	–	6	–	0	2	–	7	–	0
Bethel (KS)	0	–	8	–	0	0	–	9	–	0
$ – Conference champion; Rankings from NAIA Division II poll

1972 Kansas Collegiate Athletic Conference football standings
	Conf.					Overall
Team	W		L		T	W		L		T
Friends $	6	–	1	–	1	6	–	3	–	1
Sterling	5	–	2	–	1	5	–	3	–	1
St. Mary of the Plains	5	–	3	–	0	5	–	4	–	0
Bethany (KS)	4	–	3	–	1	4	–	4	–	1
Southwestern (KS)	4	–	4	–	0	4	–	5	–	0
Kansas Wesleyan	3	–	4	–	1	3	–	5	–	1
Tabor	3	–	5	–	0	3	–	6	–	0
Bethel (KS)	3	–	5	–	0	3	–	7	–	0
McPherson	1	–	7	–	0	1	–	9	–	0
$ – Conference champion

1973 Kansas Collegiate Athletic Conference football standings
	Conf.					Overall
Team	W		L		T	W		L		T
St. Mary of the Plains +	7	–	1	–	0	7	–	3	–	0
Bethany (KS) +	7	–	1	–	0	7	–	4	–	0
Sterling	5	–	3	–	0	6	–	3	–	0
Friends	5	–	3	–	0	5	–	4	–	0
Tabor	4	–	4	–	0	4	–	5	–	0
Bethel (KS)	3	–	5	–	0	3	–	6	–	0
McPherson	2	–	6	–	0	2	–	8	–	0
Southwestern (KS)	2	–	6	–	0	2	–	7	–	0
Kansas Wesleyan	1	–	7	–	0	2	–	8	–	0
+ – Conference co-champions

1974 Kansas Collegiate Athletic Conference football standings
	Conf.					Overall
Team	W		L		T	W		L		T
No. 15 Friends $	8	–	0	–	0	9	–	2	–	0
Bethany (KS)	5	–	3	–	0	6	–	4	–	0
St. Mary of the Plains	5	–	3	–	0	6	–	4	–	0
Bethel (KS)	5	–	3	–	0	5	–	4	–	0
Southwestern (KS)	5	–	3	–	0	5	–	4	–	0
Tabor	3	–	5	–	0	3	–	6	–	0
McPherson	2	–	6	–	0	2	–	7	–	0
Kansas Wesleyan	2	–	6	–	0	2	–	8	–	0
Sterling	1	–	7	–	0	1	–	8	–	0
$ – Conference champion; Rankings from NAIA Division II poll

1975 Kansas Collegiate Athletic Conference football standings
	Conf.					Overall
Team	W		L		T	W		L		T
No. 13 St. Mary of the Plains $	7	–	1	–	0	8	–	2	–	0
Southwestern (KS)	5	–	3	–	0	6	–	3	–	0
Friends	5	–	3	–	0	5	–	4	–	0
Kansas Wesleyan	5	–	3	–	0	5	–	5	–	0
Sterling	4	–	3	–	1	4	–	4	–	1
Bethany (KS)	3	–	5	–	0	3	–	7	–	0
McPherson	2	–	5	–	1	2	–	7	–	1
Bethel (KS) *	2	–	6	–	0	2	–	7	–	0
Tabor	2	–	6	–	0	2	–	7	–	0
$ – Conference champion; * – Bethel forfeited games to Bethany, Kansas Wesleyan, Southwestern, Friends, Tabor, and Sterling due to an ineligible player; Rankings from NAIA Division II poll

1976 Kansas Collegiate Athletic Conference football standings
	Conf.					Overall
Team	W		L		T	W		L		T
No. 8 Friends $	8	–	0	–	0	8	–	1	–	0
Sterling	6	–	2	–	0	6	–	3	–	0
Bethany (KS)	5	–	3	–	0	6	–	4	–	0
Bethel (KS)	5	–	3	–	0	5	–	4	–	0
McPherson	4	–	4	–	0	4	–	5	–	0
Southwestern (KS)	3	–	5	–	0	3	–	6	–	0
St. Mary of the Plains	3	–	5	–	0	3	–	6	–	0
Kansas Wesleyan	2	–	6	–	0	3	–	7	–	0
Tabor	0	–	8	–	0	0	–	9	–	0
$ – Conference champion; Rankings from NAIA Division II poll

1977 Kansas Collegiate Athletic Conference football standings
	Conf.					Overall
Team	W		L		T	W		L		T
No. 8 Bethany (KS) $	8	–	0	–	0	9	–	1	–	0
Bethel (KS)	7	–	1	–	0	7	–	2	–	0
Southwestern (KS)	6	–	2	–	0	7	–	2	–	0
Friends	5	–	3	–	0	5	–	4	–	0
Sterling	3	–	5	–	0	3	–	6	–	0
Tabor	3	–	5	–	0	3	–	6	–	0
Kansas Wesleyan	2	–	5	–	1	2	–	7	–	1
St. Mary of the Plains	0	–	6	–	2	0	–	7	–	2
McPherson	0	–	7	–	1	0	–	8	–	1
$ – Conference champion; Rankings from NAIA Division II poll

1978 Kansas Collegiate Athletic Conference football standings
	Conf.					Overall
Team	W		L		T	W		L		T
No. 8 Bethany (KS) $^	8	–	0	–	0	10	–	1	–	0
Southwestern (KS)	7	–	1	–	0	7	–	2	–	0
Friends	5	–	3	–	0	5	–	4	–	0
McPherson	5	–	3	–	0	5	–	4	–	0
Tabor	4	–	4	–	0	4	–	6	–	0
Sterling	3	–	5	–	0	3	–	6	–	0
St. Mary of the Plains	3	–	5	–	0	3	–	7	–	0
Kansas Wesleyan	1	–	7	–	0	1	–	9	–	0
Bethel (KS)	0	–	8	–	0	0	–	9	–	0
$ – Conference champion; ^ – NAIA Division II playoff participant; Rankings from NAIA Division II poll

1979 Kansas Collegiate Athletic Conference football standings
	Conf.					Overall
Team	W		L		T	W		L		T
No. 4 Bethany (KS) $^	8	–	0	–	0	11	–	1	–	0
Tabor	7	–	1	–	0	7	–	3	–	0
Friends	6	–	2	–	0	7	–	2	–	0
Southwestern (KS)	5	–	3	–	0	5	–	4	–	0
McPherson	3	–	5	–	0	3	–	6	–	0
Bethel (KS)	3	–	5	–	0	3	–	6	–	0
Sterling	2	–	6	–	0	2	–	7	–	0
Kansas Wesleyan	2	–	6	–	0	2	–	7	–	0
St. Mary of the Plains	1	–	7	–	0	1	–	9	–	0
$ – Conference champion; ^ – NAIA Division II playoff participant; Rankings from NAIA Division II poll

1980 Kansas Collegiate Athletic Conference football standings
	Conf.					Overall
Team	W		L		T	W		L		T
No. 12 Bethany (KS) $	7	–	1	–	0	9	–	1	–	0
Kansas Wesleyan	6	–	2	–	0	6	–	4	–	0
St. Mary of the Plains	6	–	2	–	0	6	–	4	–	0
Southwestern (KS)	4	–	4	–	0	4	–	5	–	0
Bethel (KS)	3	–	4	–	1	3	–	5	–	1
Friends	3	–	5	–	0	4	–	5	–	0
Sterling	2	–	5	–	1	2	–	6	–	1
McPherson	2	–	6	–	0	2	–	7	–	0
Tabor	2	–	6	–	0	2	–	7	–	0
$ – Conference champion; Rankings from NAIA Division II poll

1981 Kansas Collegiate Athletic Conference football standings
	Conf.					Overall
Team	W		L		T	W		L		T
No. 13 Bethany (KS) $	8	–	0	–	0	9	–	1	–	0
Southwestern (KS)	5	–	2	–	1	5	–	2	–	2
Friends	5	–	3	–	0	5	–	4	–	0
Sterling	5	–	3	–	0	5	–	4	–	0
St. Mary of the Plains	4	–	4	–	0	4	–	6	–	0
Tabor	3	–	5	–	0	3	–	6	–	0
Kansas Wesleyan	2	–	5	–	1	2	–	7	–	1
McPherson	2	–	6	–	0	2	–	7	–	0
Bethel (KS)	1	–	7	–	0	1	–	8	–	0
$ – Conference champion; Rankings from NAIA Division II poll

1982 Kansas Collegiate Athletic Conference football standings
	Conf.					Overall
Team	W		L		T	W		L		T
Southwestern (KS) +	8	–	1	–	0	9	–	2	–	0
Kansas Wesleyan +	8	–	1	–	0	8	–	2	–	0
Sterling	7	–	2	–	0	7	–	2	–	0
Friends	5	–	4	–	0	5	–	4	–	0
Bethany (KS)	5	–	4	–	0	5	–	5	–	0
Ottawa	4	–	5	–	0	4	–	6	–	0
Tabor	4	–	5	–	0	4	–	6	–	0
Bethel (KS)	3	–	6	–	0	3	–	6	–	0
St. Mary of the Plains	1	–	8	–	0	1	–	9	–	0
McPherson	0	–	9	–	0	0	–	9	–	0
+ – Conference co-champions

1983 Kansas Collegiate Athletic Conference football standings
	Conf.					Overall
Team	W		L		T	W		L		T
No. 9 Southwestern (KS) $	8	–	0	–	1	8	–	2	–	1
No. 10 Bethany (KS)	7	–	2	–	0	8	–	2	–	0
No. 19 Sterling	6	–	2	–	1	6	–	2	–	1
Bethel (KS)	6	–	3	–	0	6	–	3	–	0
St. Mary of the Plains	4	–	5	–	0	4	–	6	–	0
Kansas Wesleyan	3	–	6	–	0	3	–	7	–	0
Ottawa	3	–	6	–	0	3	–	7	–	0
McPherson	2	–	6	–	1	2	–	6	–	1
Tabor	2	–	6	–	1	2	–	6	–	1
Friends	2	–	7	–	0	2	–	7	–	0
$ – Conference champion; Rankings from NAIA Division II poll

1984 Kansas Collegiate Athletic Conference football standings
	Conf.					Overall
Team	W		L		T	W		L		T
No. 3 Bethel (KS) $^	9	–	0	–	0	9	–	1	–	0
No. 8 Southwestern (KS) ^	8	–	1	–	0	9	–	3	–	0
Sterling	6	–	3	–	0	6	–	3	–	0
Bethany (KS)	5	–	4	–	0	6	–	4	–	0
Ottawa	5	–	4	–	0	5	–	5	–	0
Friends	4	–	5	–	0	4	–	6	–	0
St. Mary of the Plains	4	–	5	–	0	4	–	6	–	0
Tabor	3	–	6	–	0	3	–	7	–	0
McPherson	1	–	8	–	0	1	–	8	–	0
Kansas Wesleyan	0	–	9	–	0	0	–	10	–	0
$ – Conference champion; ^ – NAIA Division II playoff participant; Rankings from NAIA Division II poll

1985 Kansas Collegiate Athletic Conference football standings
	Conf.					Overall
Team	W		L		T	W		L		T
No. 15 Southwestern (KS) $	8	–	1	–	0	8	–	2	–	0
Bethany (KS)	7	–	2	–	0	7	–	2	–	0
No. 17 Bethel (KS)	7	–	2	–	0	7	–	2	–	0
Sterling	6	–	3	–	0	7	–	3	–	0
Ottawa	5	–	4	–	0	5	–	5	–	0
St. Mary of the Plains	4	–	5	–	0	5	–	5	–	0
Friends	3	–	6	–	0	3	–	6	–	0
Tabor	2	–	7	–	0	2	–	7	–	0
Kansas Wesleyan	2	–	7	–	0	2	–	8	–	0
McPherson	1	–	8	–	0	1	–	8	–	0
$ – Conference champion; Rankings from NAIA Division II poll

1986 Kansas Collegiate Athletic Conference football standings
	Conf.					Overall
Team	W		L		T	W		L		T
No. 12 Bethany (KS) $	8	–	1	–	0	8	–	1	–	0
No. 15 Bethel (KS)	7	–	2	–	0	7	–	2	–	0
No. 19 Southwestern (KS)	7	–	2	–	0	7	–	3	–	0
Kansas Wesleyan	6	–	3	–	0	6	–	4	–	0
Sterling	6	–	3	–	0	6	–	4	–	0
St. Mary of the Plains	4	–	5	–	0	4	–	6	–	0
Tabor	3	–	6	–	0	3	–	6	–	0
Friends	2	–	7	–	0	2	–	7	–	0
Ottawa	2	–	7	–	0	2	–	8	–	0
McPherson	0	–	9	–	0	0	–	9	–	0
$ – Conference champion; Rankings from NAIA Division II poll

1987 Kansas Collegiate Athletic Conference football standings
	Conf.					Overall
Team	W		L		T	W		L		T
No. 8 Bethany (KS) +^	8	–	1	–	0	8	–	2	–	0
No. 17 Southwestern (KS) +^	8	–	1	–	0	8	–	2	–	0
Kansas Wesleyan	7	–	2	–	0	7	–	3	–	0
Sterling	6	–	3	–	0	6	–	4	–	0
Friends	5	–	4	–	0	6	–	4	–	0
St. Mary of the Plains	3	–	6	–	0	4	–	6	–	0
Bethel (KS)	3	–	6	–	0	3	–	6	–	0
Ottawa	3	–	6	–	0	3	–	7	–	0
McPherson	1	–	8	–	0	1	–	8	–	0
Tabor	1	–	8	–	0	1	–	8	–	0
+ – Conference co-champions; ^ – NAIA Division II playoff participant; Rankings from NAIA Division II poll

1988 Kansas Collegiate Athletic Conference football standings
	Conf.					Overall
Team	W		L		T	W		L		T
No. 6 Bethany (KS) $^	9	–	0	–	0	10	–	1	–	0
McPherson	6	–	3	–	0	6	–	4	–	0
Southwestern (KS)	6	–	3	–	0	6	–	4	–	0
St. Mary of the Plains	5	–	4	–	0	6	–	4	–	0
Kansas Wesleyan	5	–	4	–	0	5	–	4	–	0
Bethel (KS)	5	–	4	–	0	5	–	5	–	0
Ottawa	5	–	4	–	0	5	–	5	–	0
Friends	2	–	7	–	0	2	–	8	–	0
Sterling	1	–	8	–	0	1	–	9	–	0
Tabor	1	–	8	–	0	1	–	9	–	0
$ – Conference champion; ^ – NAIA Division II playoff participant; Rankings from NAIA Division II poll

1989 Kansas Collegiate Athletic Conference football standings
	Conf.					Overall
Team	W		L		T	W		L		T
No. 5 St. Mary of the Plains $^	9	–	0	–	0	10	–	1	–	0
No. 14 Bethany (KS)	8	–	1	–	0	8	–	1	–	0
Southwestern (KS)	7	–	2	–	0	7	–	3	–	0
Kansas Wesleyan	5	–	4	–	0	6	–	4	–	0
Bethel (KS)	4	–	5	–	0	5	–	5	–	0
McPherson	4	–	5	–	0	5	–	5	–	0
Ottawa	3	–	6	–	0	3	–	7	–	0
Friends	2	–	7	–	0	3	–	7	–	0
Sterling	2	–	7	–	0	2	–	7	–	0
Tabor	1	–	8	–	0	1	–	9	–	0
$ – Conference champion; ^ – NAIA Division II playoff participant; Rankings from NAIA Division II poll

1990 Kansas Collegiate Athletic Conference football standings
	Conf.					Overall
Team	W		L		T	W		L		T
No. 11 St. Mary of the Plains +^	8	–	1	–	0	9	–	2	–	0
No. 17 Bethany (KS) +^	8	–	1	–	0	8	–	2	–	0
Friends	7	–	2	–	0	8	–	2	–	0
Southwestern (KS)	6	–	3	–	0	6	–	4	–	0
Kansas Wesleyan	5	–	4	–	0	6	–	4	–	0
Ottawa	5	–	4	–	0	5	–	5	–	0
Bethel (KS)	2	–	7	–	0	3	–	7	–	0
McPherson	2	–	7	–	0	3	–	7	–	0
Sterling	1	–	8	–	0	1	–	9	–	0
Tabor	1	–	8	–	0	1	–	9	–	0
+ – Conference co-champions; ^ – NAIA Division II playoff participant; Rankings from NAIA Division II poll

1991 Kansas Collegiate Athletic Conference football standings
	Conf.					Overall
Team	W		L		T	W		L		T
No. 8 St. Mary of the Plains +^	8	–	1	–	0	9	–	2	–	0
No. 13 Bethany (KS) +^	8	–	1	–	0	8	–	2	–	0
No. 14 Friends +	8	–	1	–	0	8	–	2	–	0
Ottawa	5	–	4	–	0	5	–	5	–	0
Southwestern (KS)	5	–	4	–	0	5	–	5	–	0
Bethel (KS)	3	–	6	–	0	4	–	6	–	0
Sterling	3	–	6	–	0	4	–	6	–	0
Kansas Wesleyan	3	–	6	–	0	3	–	7	–	0
McPherson	1	–	8	–	0	1	–	8	–	0
Tabor	1	–	8	–	0	1	–	9	–	0
+ – Conference co-champions; ^ – NAIA Division II playoff participant; Rankings from NAIA Division II poll

1992 Kansas Collegiate Athletic Conference football standings
	Conf.					Overall
Team	W		L		T	W		L		T
No. 14 Friends $^	8	–	0	–	0	8	–	3	–	0
No. 25 Bethany (KS)	7	–	1	–	0	7	–	1	–	1
Ottawa	5	–	3	–	0	5	–	3	–	1
Southwestern (KS)	5	–	3	–	0	5	–	4	–	0
McPherson	3	–	5	–	0	3	–	5	–	0
Kansas Wesleyan	3	–	5	–	0	3	–	7	–	0
Bethel (KS)	2	–	6	–	0	3	–	6	–	0
Sterling	2	–	6	–	0	2	–	7	–	0
Tabor	1	–	7	–	0	1	–	8	–	0
$ – Conference champion; ^ – NAIA Division II playoff participant; Rankings from NAIA Division II poll

1993 Kansas Collegiate Athletic Conference football standings
	Conf.					Overall
Team	W		L		T	W		L		T
No. 15 Bethany (KS) $^	8	–	0	–	0	9	–	2	–	0
Sterling	6	–	2	–	0	6	–	4	–	0
Ottawa	5	–	3	–	0	6	–	4	–	0
Tabor	4	–	4	–	0	4	–	4	–	0
Southwestern (KS)	4	–	4	–	0	4	–	5	–	0
Kansas Wesleyan	3	–	5	–	0	4	–	6	–	0
Friends	3	–	5	–	0	4	–	6	–	0
Bethel (KS)	3	–	5	–	0	3	–	6	–	0
McPherson	0	–	8	–	0	0	–	8	–	0
$ – Conference champion; ^ – NAIA Division II playoff participant; Rankings from NAIA Division II poll

1994 Kansas Collegiate Athletic Conference football standings
	Conf.					Overall
Team	W		L		T	W		L		T
No. 18 Friends +	7	–	1	–	0	8	–	2	–	0
No. 22 Bethany (KS) +	7	–	1	–	0	7	–	3	–	0
Kansas Wesleyan	6	–	2	–	0	7	–	3	–	0
Ottawa	5	–	3	–	0	5	–	5	–	0
Southwestern (KS)	5	–	3	–	0	5	–	5	–	0
Bethel (KS)	3	–	5	–	0	4	–	6	–	0
Sterling	2	–	6	–	0	2	–	8	–	0
Tabor	1	–	7	–	0	1	–	9	–	0
McPherson	0	–	8	–	0	0	–	10	–	0
+ – Conference co-champions; Rankings from NAIA Division II poll

1995 Kansas Collegiate Athletic Conference football standings
	Conf.					Overall
Team	W		L		T	W		L		T
No. 10 Bethany (KS) $^	8	–	0	–	0	10	–	1	–	0
Ottawa	6	–	2	–	0	7	–	3	–	0
Southwestern (KS)	5	–	3	–	0	6	–	4	–	0
Friends	5	–	3	–	0	5	–	4	–	0
Bethel (KS)	4	–	4	–	0	4	–	5	–	0
McPherson	4	–	4	–	0	4	–	6	–	0
Sterling	3	–	5	–	0	3	–	7	–	0
Kansas Wesleyan *	1	–	7	–	0	1	–	9	–	0
Tabor	0	–	8	–	0	0	–	10	–	0
$ – Conference champion; ^ – NAIA Division II playoff participant * – Kansas Wesleyan forfeited seven victories including conference wins over Ottawa, Friends, Bethel (KS), McPherson, and Sterling.; Rankings from NAIA Division II poll

1996 Kansas Collegiate Athletic Conference football standings
	Conf.			Overall
Team	W		L	W		L
No. 8 Bethany (KS) $^	8	–	0	8	–	2
Bethel (KS)	7	–	1	7	–	3
No. 23 Southwestern (KS)	6	–	2	7	–	3
Friends	5	–	3	5	–	5
McPherson	4	–	4	5	–	5
Kansas Wesleyan	3	–	5	3	–	7
Sterling	2	–	6	2	–	8
Ottawa	1	–	7	1	–	8
Tabor	0	–	8	0	–	10
$ – Conference champion; ^ – NAIA Division II playoff participant; Rankings from NAIA Division II poll
