= 1938 Ottawa Braves football team =

College football season

1938 Ottawa Braves football
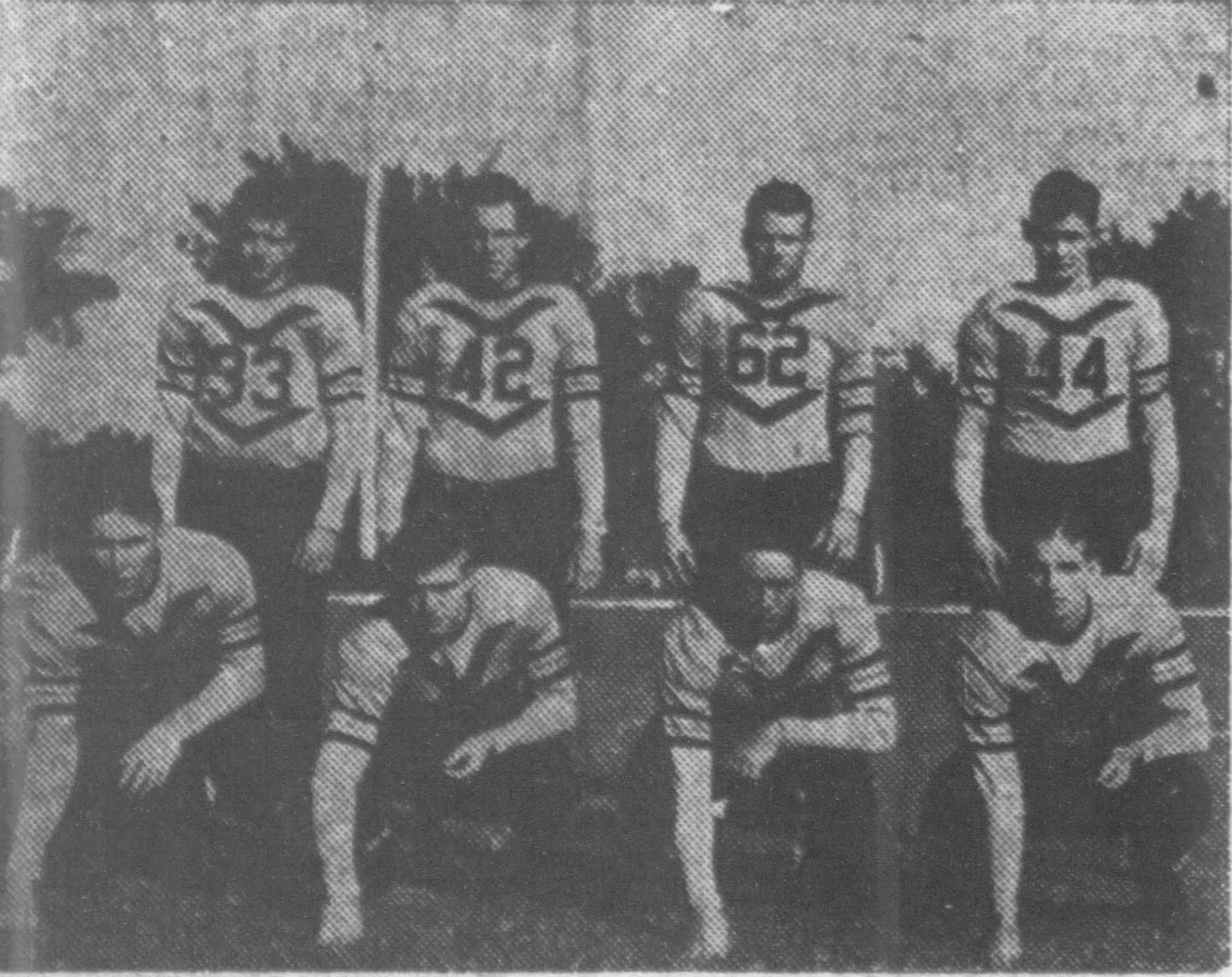
- 1938 Ottawa backfield players. Top row, left to right: Jack Ramsey, Lyle Swetnam, Roy Fitzpatrick, Don Meek. Bottom row: Oliver Smith, Lyman Morgan, Lester Taylor, Norman Gerhold

KCAC champion
- Conference: Kansas Collegiate Athletic Conference
- Record: 8–0 (5–0 KCAC)
- Head coach: Dick Godlove (3rd season)
- Home stadium: Cook Field

1938 Kansas Collegiate Athletic Conference football standings
	Conf.					Overall
Team	W		L		T	W		L		T
Ottawa $	5	–	0	–	0	8	–	0	–	0
Bethany (KS)	3	–	2	–	0	4	–	4	–	0
College of Emporia	3	–	2	–	0	4	–	4	–	1
McPherson	2	–	3	–	0	3	–	5	–	1
Kansas Wesleyan	1	–	4	–	0	2	–	6	–	1
Baker	1	–	4	–	0	2	–	7	–	0
$ – Conference champion

The 1938 Ottawa Braves football team was an American football team that represented Ottawa University of Ottawa, Kansas, as a member of the Kansas Collegiate Athletic Conference (KCAC) during the 1938 college football season. In their third season under head coach Dick Godlove, the Braves compiled an 8–0 record (5–0 against conference opponents), won the KCAC championship, and outscored opponents by a total of 134 to 18. It was the first undefeated season in Ottawa football history, a feat later repeated in 1960, 1961, and 1965.

== Schedule ==
Date	Opponent	Site	Result	Attendance	Source
September 30	Haskell*	Ottawa, KS	W 14–0		
October 7	at McPherson	McPherson, KS	W 7–0		
October 14	William Jewell*	Ottawa, KS	W 13–6		
October 21	Kansas Wesleyan	Ottawa, KS	W 12–6		
October 28	at Bethel (KS)*	Newton, KS	W 20–0		
November 4	Bethany (KS)^{†}	Ottawa, KS	W 13–6		
November 11	College of Emporia	Schaffner Field; Emporia, KS	W 28–0	> 2,900	
November 18	at Baker*	Baldwin City, KS	W 27–0		
*Non-conference game; ^{†}Homecoming

== Roster ==
- Lester Adams, tackle/end, 225 pounds
- Elvis Berger, guard, 170 pounds
- Roy Fitzpatrick, back, 170 pounds
- Norman Gerhold, back, 175 pounds
- Eugene Harding, end, 185 pounds
- Leonard Hofstra, tackle, 225 pounds
- Kenneth Hough, guard, 175 pounds
- Bill Mattis, back, 175 pounds
- Don Meek, back, 170 pounds
- Lyman Morgan, back, 160 pounds
- Phillip Palmer, back, 180 pounds
- Jack Ramsey, back, 160 pounds
- Walter Reames, tackle, 170 pounds
- Oliver Smith, back, 165 pounds
- Lyle Swetnam, end, 155 pounds
- Lester Taylor, guard, 160 pounds
- George Von Arb, end, 175 pounds
