= 1965 Ottawa Braves football team =

College football season

1965 Ottawa Braves football

KCAC champion
- Conference: Kansas Collegiate Athletic Conference
- Record: 9–0 (9–0 KCAC)
- Head coach: Richard Peters (13th season)
- Home stadium: Cook Field

1965 Kansas Collegiate Athletic Conference football standings
	Conf.					Overall
Team	W		L		T	W		L		T
No. 5 Ottawa $	9	–	0	–	0	9	–	0	–	0
Bethany (KS)	7	–	2	–	0	7	–	2	–	0
Baker	6	–	3	–	0	6	–	3	–	0
College of Emporia	5	–	3	–	1	5	–	3	–	1
Southwestern (KS)	5	–	3	–	1	5	–	3	–	1
Friends	4	–	5	–	0	4	–	5	–	0
Kansas Wesleyan	3	–	6	–	0	3	–	6	–	0
Sterling	3	–	6	–	0	3	–	6	–	0
McPherson	2	–	7	–	0	2	–	7	–	0
Bethel (KS)	0	–	9	–	0	0	–	9	–	0
$ – Conference champion; Rankings from NAIA poll

The 1965 Ottawa Braves football team was an American football team that represented Ottawa University of Ottawa, Kansas, as a member of the Kansas Collegiate Athletic Conference (KCAC) during the 1965 NAIA football season. In their 13th season under head coach Richard Peters, the Braves compiled a 9–0 record, won the KCAC championship, and outscored opponents by a total of 389 to 70. It was the fourth undefeated season in Ottawa football history following the 1938, 1960, and 1961 seasons.

During the eight years from 1960 to 1967, the Braves compiled a 66–6 record.

On October 1, 1965, Ottawa quarterback Eddie Buzzell set a new NAIA record with eight touchdown passes in an 82–0 victory over Sterling.

== Schedule ==
Date	Opponent	Site	Result	Source
September 17	Friends	Cook Field; Ottawa, KS	W 57–2	
September 25	at Bethel (KS)	North Newton, KS	W 47–7	
October 1	Sterling	Cook Field; Ottawa, KS	W 82–0	
October 9	at College of Emporia	Emporia, KS	W 36–6	
October 16	Kansas Wesleyan	Cook Field; Ottawa, KS	W 27–6	
October 23	Southwestern (KS)^{†}	Cook Field; Ottawa, KS	W 27–7	
October 29	at McPherson	McPherson, KS	W 41–15	
November 5	Bethany (KS)	Cook Field; Ottawa, KS	W 44–7	
November 12	at Baker	Baldwin City, KS	W 28–20	
^{†}Homecoming
