= Court of Industrial Relations =

Court of Industrial Relations may refer to:

- Court of Industrial Relations (Nebraska)
- Court of Industrial Relations (Kansas)
- Court of Industrial Relations in the Philippines, associated with the National Labor Relations Commission (Philippines)
