= Ben Moor (American football) =

American football player and coach

Playing career
- 1954–1957: Ottawa (KS)

Coaching career (HC unless noted)
- 1968–1969: Ottawa (KS) (assistant)
- 1972–1975: Ottawa (KS)

Head coaching record
- Overall: 18–19
- Bowls: 1–0

Accomplishments and honors

Championships
- 1 HAAC (1972)

Awards
- HAAC Coach of the Year (1972)

Ben Moor is an American former college football coach. He served as the head football coach at Ottawa University in Ottawa, Kansas for four seasons, from 1972 to 1975, compiling a record of 18–19. In 1972, his team won the Mineral Water Bowl, defeating Friends by a score of 27–20. Moor was inducted into the Ottawa University Athletic Hall of Fame in 2000.

== Head coaching record ==
Year	Team	Overall	Conference	Standing	Bowl/playoffs
Ottawa Braves (Heart of America Athletic Conference) (1972–1975)
1972	Ottawa	9–1	6–1	1st	W Mineral Water
1973	Ottawa	3–6	1–6	7th	
1974	Ottawa	4–5	2–4	T–4th	
1975	Ottawa	2–7	0–6	7th	
Ottawa:		18–19	9–17		
Total:		18–19			
National championship Conference title Conference division title or championship game berth
