= Alexander Howat =

Scottish-born American coal miner and trade union leader

Trade union leader Alexander Howat as he appeared in 1921.

Alexander McWhirter Howat (September 10, 1876 – December 10, 1945) was a Scottish-born American coal miner and trade union leader. Howat is best remembered as the chief opponent of the Kansas Court of Industrial Relations in the early 1920s and as the leader of a radical rank-and-file revolt against the officialdom of the United Mine Workers of America (UMWA) in 1923. Howat's activity ultimately led to his expulsion from the UMWA in 1930, forcing him into new occupations outside the organized labor movement.

== Biography ==
=== Early years ===
Alexander Howat was born in Glasgow, Scotland on September 10, 1876. He emigrated to the United States as a small child, arriving with his parents in 1879. The family lived first in Troy, New York and Braidwood, Illinois, before moving to Crawford County, Kansas, located in the Southeastern corner of the state. There Alex went to work in the coal mines for the first time as a boy of 10. He worked as a coal miner until the age of 22.

Howat's activity in the mines soon lead him to membership in the United Mine Workers union. In 1902 he was chosen by his peers as a union official for the first time, when he was elected to the board for District 14 of the UMWA, covering the state of Kansas. In 1906 Howat was elected president of District 14 of the UMWA, retaining that position without interruption until 1914, when he refused to stand for re-election amidst charges of having accepted bribes from mine operators.

Following investigation of this corruption charge, which led to Howat's exoneration, he was returned as the president of District 14 UMWA in 1916, remaining in this position through 1921.

=== The Kansas Industrial Relations Act ===
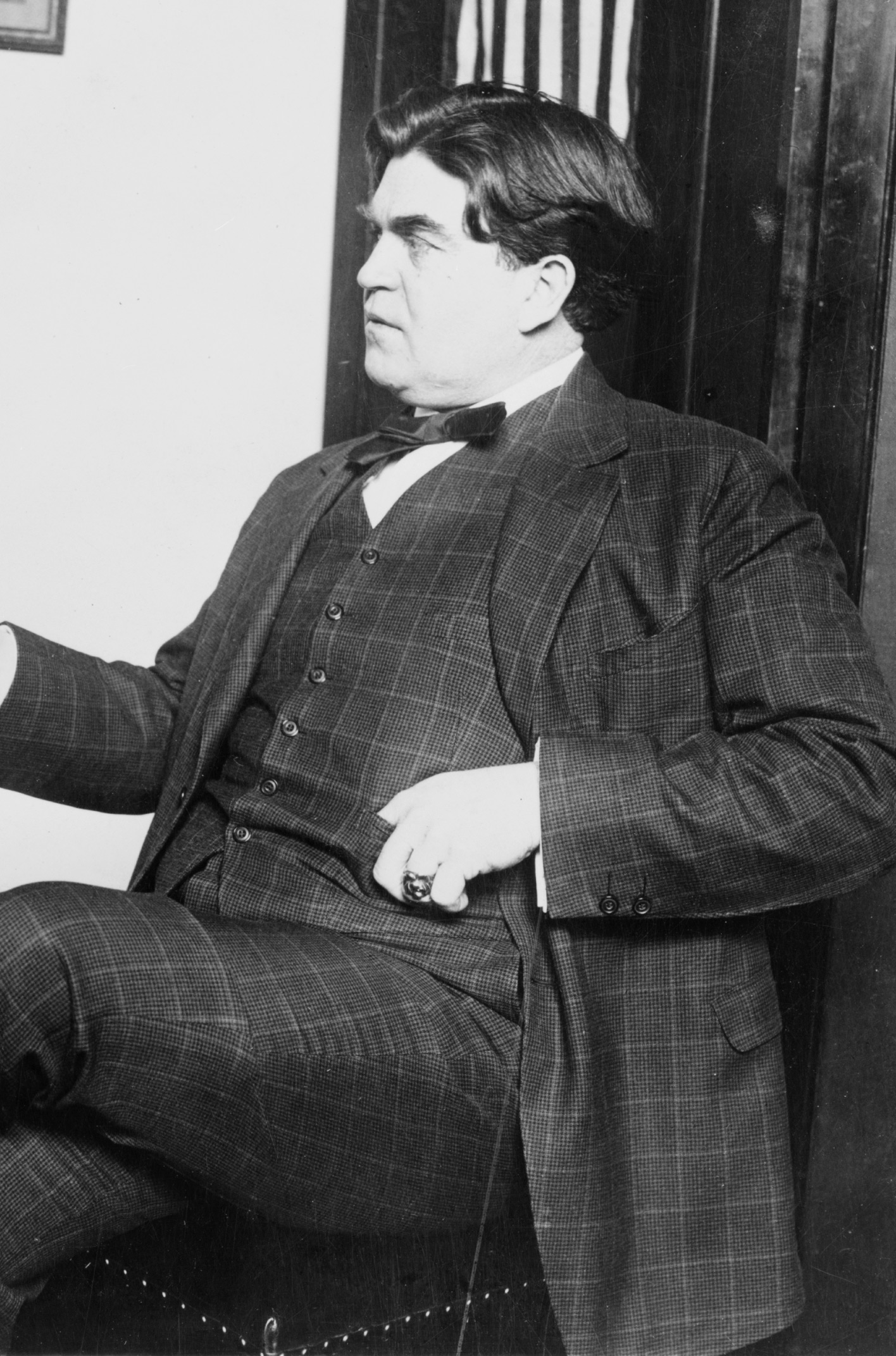
John L. Lewis, President of the United Mine Workers of America and nemesis of Alexander Howat, as he appeared in 1922.

During World War I and the period immediately following the war Howat led several strikes of Kansas coal miners. These work stoppages moved the Kansas Legislature to pass the Kansas Industrial Relations Act in 1920, which banned strikes, picketing, and the use of boycott in favor of a binding Court of Industrial Relations for the resolution of labor disputes.

Howat was a bitter opponent of this new system and in 1921 he led a strike in open defiance of the new industrial court arrangement. When he refused to participate in the proceedings of the industrial court, Howat was arrested. Over the next three years Howat was repeatedly jailed and released for his refusal to acknowledge the legitimacy of the Kansas Industrial Court system.

UMWA President Lewis and the union's executive board agreed with mine operators that Howat's support of wildcat strikes had constituted a violation of the union's contract, and Howat and other District 14 leaders were removed in favor of newly appointed officials. The charters of 83 Kansas locals were also revoked by the executive board.

Howat and the Kansas situation was brought before the September 1921 annual convention of the UMWA at Indianapolis, Indiana. Following protracted debate, the convention voted to sustain the actions of Lewis and its executive board by a vote of 2,753 to 1,781, with the delegations from the Midwestern states of Kansas, Illinois, and Indiana siding with Howat in the minority. Despite Howat's defeat on the main question concerning him, he was elected by the 1921 convention as a delegate of the UMWA to the 1922 International Miners Conference, scheduled to be held in Europe.

The battle within the UMWA continued in the months after the September 1921 convention, with Kansas miners, backed by the Illinois district organization, continuing their fight against the International union and the Kansas Industrial Court. In reply, on October 12, 1921, Lewis revoked the charter of District 14 altogether, ousting Howat and his associates in favor of a new slate of "provisional" officers who were to reorganize the district. Those miners continuing to strike against Kansas mine operators without sanction of the UMWA were expelled from the union. Howat's local had its charter revoked and union officials maintained that by this action Howat was himself excluded from the union.

The 1922 annual convention of the UMWA was eventful, with Howat and 125 of his expelled followers in attendance. Howat forced his way to the platform to speak, but was denied this opportunity by union president Lewis, who declared that since Howat was neither a delegate nor a member of the union, he was not entitled to recognition by the assembly. Anger erupted on the floor and a debate was permitted on whether Howat should be allowed to bring the Kansas situation before the body.

During an interlude in the debate the convention recognized "Mother" Mary Harris Jones, a 92-year-old radical trade union activist, who declared to the convention:

"I have known Alex Howat for twenty years, and while I have not always agreed with Alex, I want to make this statement to the audience and to the world: That my desire is to have a million Alex Howats in the nation to fight the battle of the workers. He has fought for his men and he has fought that damnable law that the governor of Kansas put on the statute books to enslave the workers. He fought it nobly and is willing to go to death for it..."

More heated debate followed, after which supporters of Howat were narrowly defeated in a roll call vote, amidst a turmoil described by one historian as "stormy scenes verging on rioting."

=== Later union activity ===
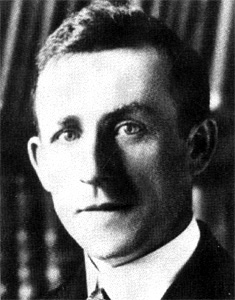
The English-born John Brophy, whom Howat supported in 1926 in the last serious effort to unseat John Lewis as head of the UMWA.

No United Mine Workers convention was held in 1923, the annual gathering being held over until January 1924, when it was convened in Indianapolis. It was there that once again Alexander Howat attempted to unite delegates in opposition to the well-entrenched president of the union, John L. Lewis. Howat combined with left wing union organizer Powers Hapgood in attempting to organize left wing delegates associated with the Communist Party's trade union mass organization, the Trade Union Educational League (TUEL) as well as anti-Lewis conservatives in an effort to depose Lewis.

The 1924 effort was a wild affair, marked by delegate demonstrations, swarming in the aisles, fist fights, and the copious use of its sergeants-at-arms by the Lewis administration. Chief among the opposition's demands was a call for the election rather than the appointment of union organizers, the election of convention committees by the body as a whole rather than the appointment, the reinstatement of Howat to good graces in the union, and reform of the UMWA's election system. Decisions were made by a deeply divided convention, amidst accusations of falsification of roll call counts by the so-called "Lewis machine."

An attempt by Howat to gain a hearing of his case by the convention was once again ruled out of order by virtue of Howat being neither a delegate nor a union member, although he was allowed the right of making an appeal to the Lewis-controlled Committee on Appeals and Grievances. In desperation Howat attempted to rush the platform to speak, but he was stopped by brawny Lewis supporters and forcefully dragged from the platform.

Lewis hastily adjourned the meeting and his supporters departed, leaving Howat and the dissidents control of the hall. Howat mounted the platform and delivered a lengthy speech in opposition to Lewis and the standing leadership of the UMWA. The rhetorical triumph proved ephemeral, as Howat and a number of his supporters remained outside of the union, with Lewis firmly retaining control of the organization.

In 1924 Howat attended the July convention of the Federated Farmer-Labor Party, an organization sponsored and largely controlled by the Communist Party. Howat was elected chairman of the governing National Committee by the gathering.

In 1926 Howat was a supporter of John Brophy in his attempt to depose Lewis from head of the UMWA. This effort, too, ended in failure.

In the aftermath of this defeat William Z. Foster of TUEL attempted to carry on the fight against the Lewis regime in the UMWA through an organized faction called the Save the Union Committee. A preliminary conference to establish this group was called in January 1928, attended by 125 delegates, of whom about 20% were Communist Party members. Brophy accepted a place as chairman of this session, although Howat declined playing a public role in this anti-Lewis opposition movement in the hopes that he would eventually be reinstated to the UMWA.

The Save the Union Committee held its formal founding convention in Pittsburgh on April 1, 1928, attended by 1100 delegates. The gathering planned a strategic strike of three coal pits in Western Pennsylvania which, if successful, would both bolster ongoing strikes throughout the region as well as establish credibility and prestige for the new miners' reform movement. Sensing that Foster's actual intention was to split the United Mine Workers and establish a new union, both Howat and Brophy moved away from the Save the Union Committee shortly after its formation. By the end of the summer the Save the Union Committee strike had come to a conclusion and a new miners' union was indeed formed, the National Miners' Union, the first of a number of dual unions promoted by the Communist Party and its trade union auxiliary group headed by Foster.

Despite his wariness towards the new radical union, Howat was never readmitted to the UMWA, however, and his trade union career effectively came to an end.

=== Later years ===
With his more than two decades in the American trade union movement abruptly terminated by expulsion, Howat began a series of other jobs, working in the 1930s and 1940s as a Kansas state border guard, editor of a labor newspaper, and gaining employment as a city employee of Pittsburg, Kansas.

=== Death and legacy ===
Alexander Howat died in Pittsburg, Kansas on December 10, 1945.

== See also ==
- Trade Union Educational League
