= 1956 College of Emporia Fighting Presbies football team =

American college football season

1956 College of Emporia Fighting Presbies football
- Conference: Kansas Collegiate Athletic Conference
- Record: 7–2 (6–1 KCAC)
- Head coach: Bill Schnebel (1st season)
- Home stadium: Schaffner Field

1956 Kansas Collegiate Athletic Conference football standings
	Conf.					Overall
Team	W		L		T	W		L		T
Kansas Wesleyan $	7	–	0	–	0	8	–	1	–	0
College of Emporia	6	–	1	–	0	7	–	2	–	0
McPherson	5	–	2	–	0	5	–	4	–	0
Bethel (KS)	4	–	3	–	0	4	–	5	–	0
Baker	3	–	4	–	0	4	–	5	–	0
Friends	2	–	5	–	0	2	–	6	–	1
Bethany (KS)	1	–	6	–	0	1	–	7	–	0
Ottawa	0	–	7	–	0	0	–	9	–	0
$ – Conference champion

The 1956 College of Emporia Fighting Presbies football team represented the College of Emporia as a member of the Kansas Collegiate Athletic Conference (KCAC) during the 1956 college football season. In their first season under head coach Bill Schnebel, the Presbies compiled an overall record of 7–2 with a mark of 6–1 in conference play, placing second in the KCAC.

== Schedule ==
Date	Opponent	Site	Result	Source
September 21	Friends	Emporia, KS	W 27–19	
September 29	at Baker	Baldwin City, KS	W 35–18	
October 6	Bethany (KS)	Emporia, KS	W 40–13	
October 13	McPherson	Emporia, KS	W 28–0	
October 20	at William Jewell*	Liberty, MO	W 25–14	
October 27	at Kansas Wesleyan	Salina,KS	L 7–21	
November 3	at Bethel (KS)	North Newton, KS	W 32–20	
November 9	Ottawa (KS)	Emporia, KS	W 47–6	
November 17	vs. Missouri Valley*	Kansas City, MO	L 14–27	
*Non-conference game
