= 1957 College of Emporia Fighting Presbies football team =

American college football season

1957 College of Emporia Fighting Presbies football
- Conference: Kansas Collegiate Athletic Conference
- Record: 2–6–1 (2–4–1 KCAC)
- Head coach: Bill Schnebel (2nd season)
- Home stadium: Schaffner Field

1957 Kansas Collegiate Athletic Conference football standings
	Conf.					Overall
Team	W		L		T	W		L		T
Kansas Wesleyan $	6	–	1	–	0	8	–	1	–	0
Baker	5	–	1	–	1	6	–	2	–	1
McPherson	5	–	2	–	0	6	–	3	–	0
Bethel (KS)	5	–	2	–	0	5	–	4	–	0
Ottawa	3	–	4	–	0	4	–	5	–	0
College of Emporia	2	–	4	–	1	2	–	6	–	1
Friends	1	–	6	–	0	1	–	8	–	0
Bethany (KS)	0	–	7	–	0	0	–	8	–	0
$ – Conference champion

The 1957 College of Emporia Fighting Presbies football team represented the College of Emporia as a member of the Kansas Collegiate Athletic Conference (KCAC) during the 1957 college football season. In their first season under head coach Bill Schnebel, the Presbies compiled an overall record of 2–6–1 record with a mark of 2–4–1 in conference play, placing sixth in the KCAC.

== Schedule ==
Date	Opponent	Site	Result	Source
September 20	at Friends	Wichita, KS	W 21–0	
September 27	Baker	Emporia, KS	T 7–7	
October 4	at Bethany (KS)	Lindsborg, KS	W 28–20	
October 12	at McPherson	McPherson, KS	L 7–40	
October 18	William Jewell*	Emporia, KS	L 6–51	
October 26	Kansas Wesleyan	Emporia, KS	L 14–20	
November 2	Bethel (KS)	Emporia, KS	L 3–27	
November 8	at Ottawa (KS)	Ottawa, KS	L 0–25	
November 14	at Missouri Valley*	Marshall, MO	L 26–39	
*Non-conference game
