= 1958 College of Emporia Fighting Presbies football team =

American college football season

1958 College of Emporia Fighting Presbies football
- Conference: Kansas Collegiate Athletic Conference
- Record: 4–5 (3–4 KCAC)
- Head coach: Bill Schnebel (3rd season)
- Home stadium: Schaffner Field

1958 Kansas Collegiate Athletic Conference football standings
	Conf.					Overall
Team	W		L		T	W		L		T
Baker $	7	–	0	–	0	8	–	1	–	0
McPherson	6	–	1	–	0	8	–	1	–	0
Ottawa	3	–	3	–	1	3	–	5	–	1
Kansas Wesleyan	3	–	4	–	0	4	–	4	–	1
College of Emporia	3	–	4	–	0	4	–	5	–	0
Bethany (KS)	2	–	4	–	1	3	–	4	–	1
Bethel (KS)	2	–	4	–	1	3	–	5	–	1
Friends	0	–	6	–	1	0	–	8	–	1
$ – Conference champion

The 1958 College of Emporia Fighting Presbies football team represented the College of Emporia as a member of the Kansas Collegiate Athletic Conference (KCAC) during the 1958 college football season. In their third season under head coach Bill Schnebel, the Presbies compiled an overall record of 4–5 record with a mark of 3–4 in conference play, tying for fourth place in the KCAC.

== Schedule ==
Date	Time	Opponent	Site	Result	Source
September 19		Friends	Schaffner Field; Emporia, KS	W 28–14	
September 26		at Baker	Baldwin City, KS	L 7–43	
October 4		Bethany (KS)	Emporia, KS	W 16–7	
October 11		McPherson	Emporia, KS	L 0–19	
October 18		Sterling*	Emporia, KS	W 41–14	
October 25		at Kansas Wesleyan	Salina, KS	L 21–27	
November 1		at Bethel (KS)	North Newton, KS	W 35–26	
November 7		Ottawa (KS)	Emporia, KS	L 6–26	
November 15	8:00 p.m.	at Missouri Valley*	Gregg-Mitchell Field; Marshall, MO	L 6–31	
*Non-conference game; All times are in Central time
