= AdventHealth Field =

Stadium in Ottawa, Kansas, US

Coordinates: 38.602937°N 95.262333°W

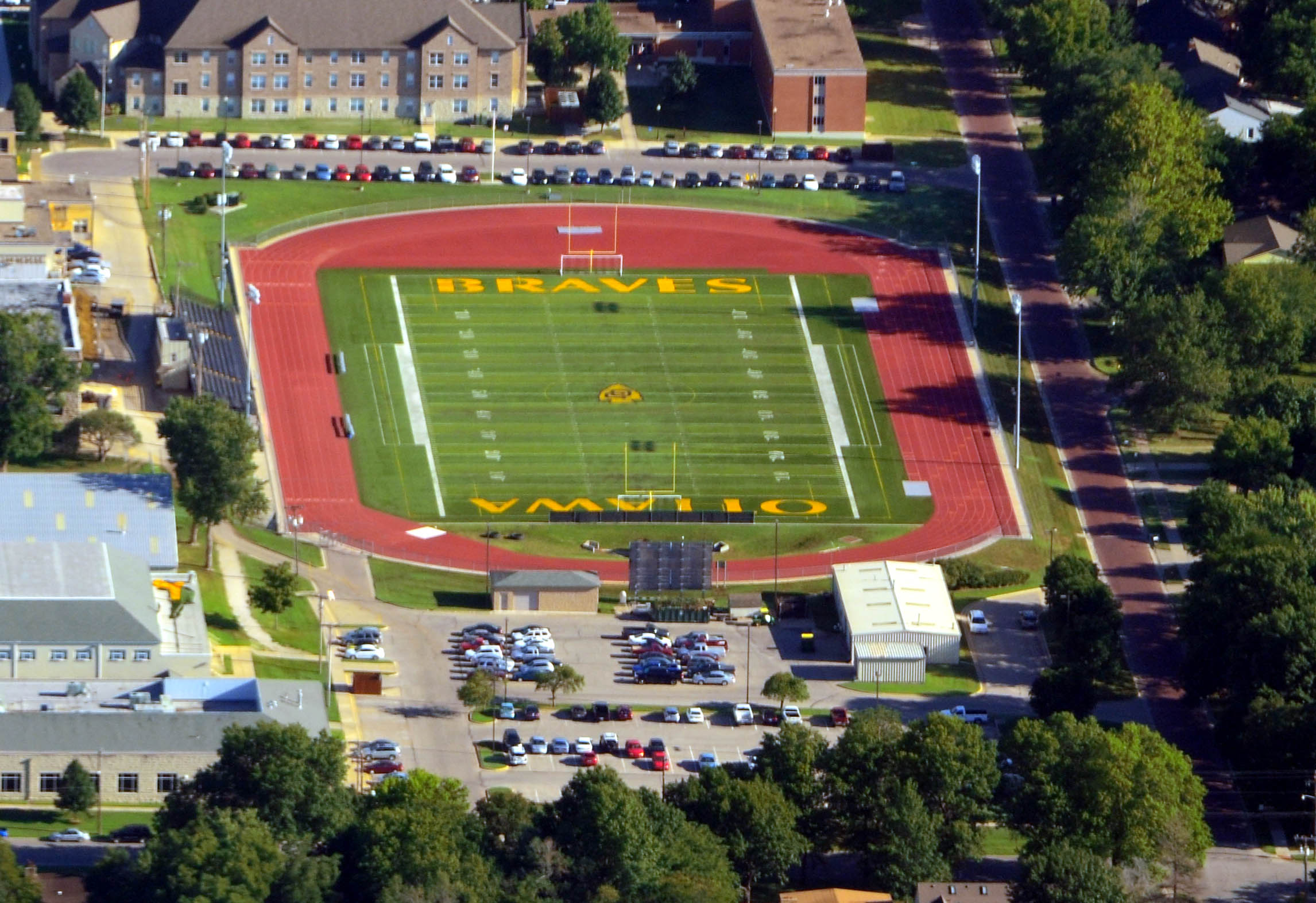
- Aerial view of the stadium in 2013
- Interactive map of AdventHealth Field
- Former names: Cook Field; Peoples Bank Field
- Address: Ottawa, Kansas; United States
- Owner: Ottawa University
- Operator: Ottawa University Athletics
- Capacity: 3,000
- Type: Stadium
- Surface: Field Turf
- Current use: Football; Lacrosse; Soccer; Track and field

Tenants
- Ottawa Braves (NAIA) teams: football, lacrosse, soccer, track and field

Website
- ottawa.edu/adventhealth-field

AdventHealth Field, formerly known as "Cook Field" and "Peoples Bank Field", is a stadium on the campus of Ottawa University in Ottawa, Kansas, United States.

The facility is primarily used by the Ottawa Braves football, lacrosse, soccer, and track and field teams.

The field turf was added in 2007 and the facility is considered one of the best of its kind in the United States for small college football.

The stadium is also used for local high school sporting events and other community events.

== Gallery ==
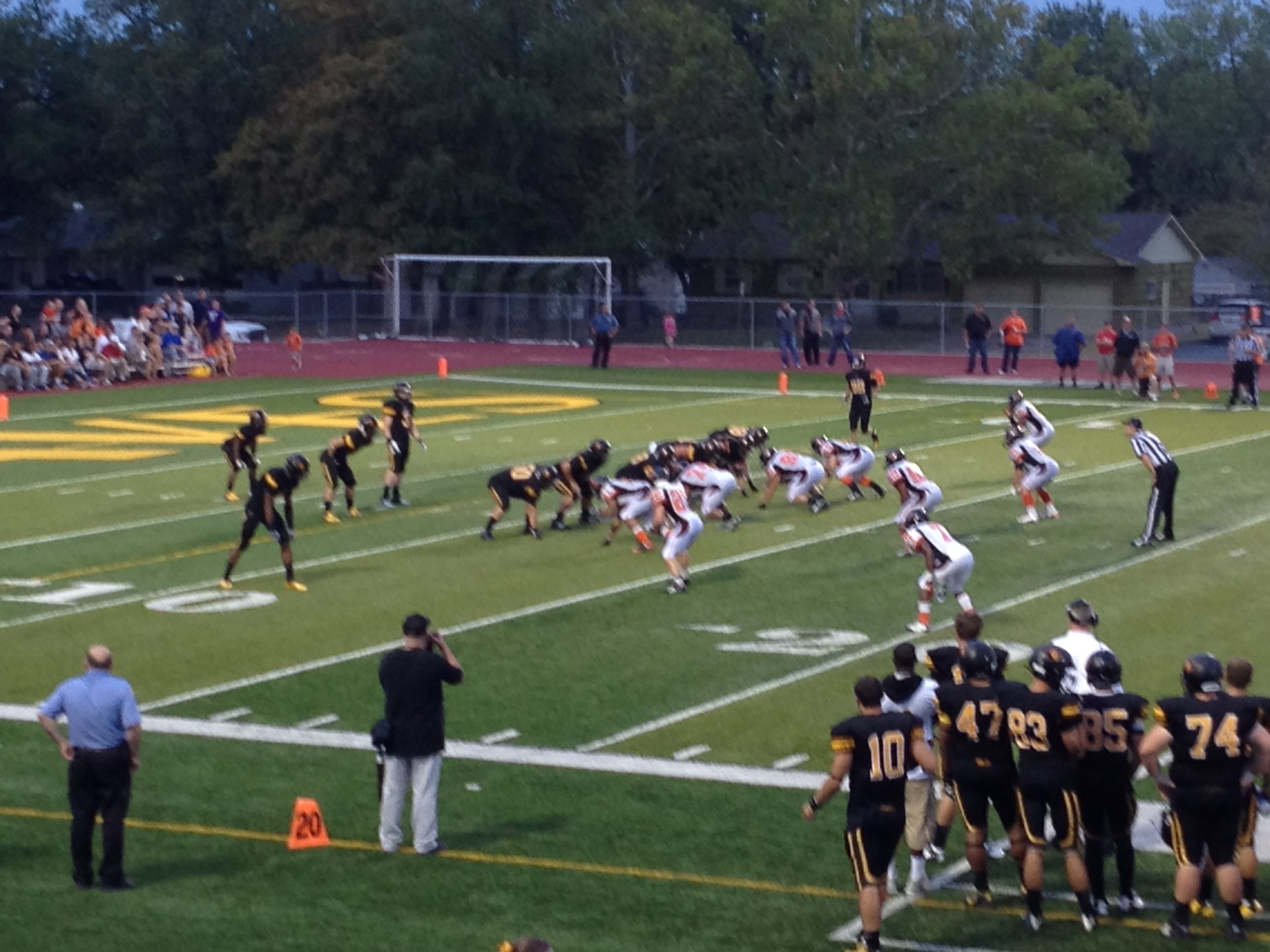
View from the stand

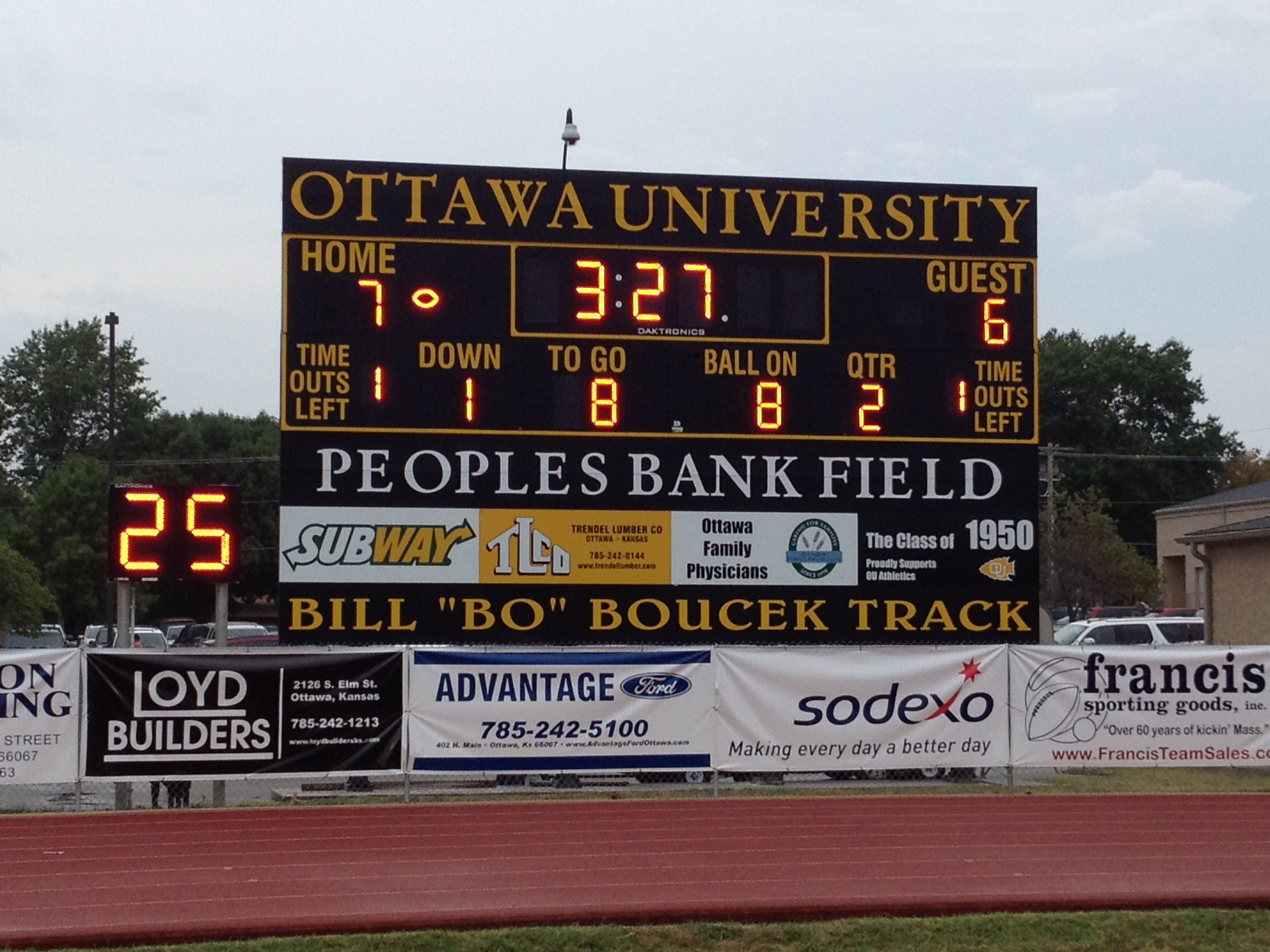
Scoreboard during a game

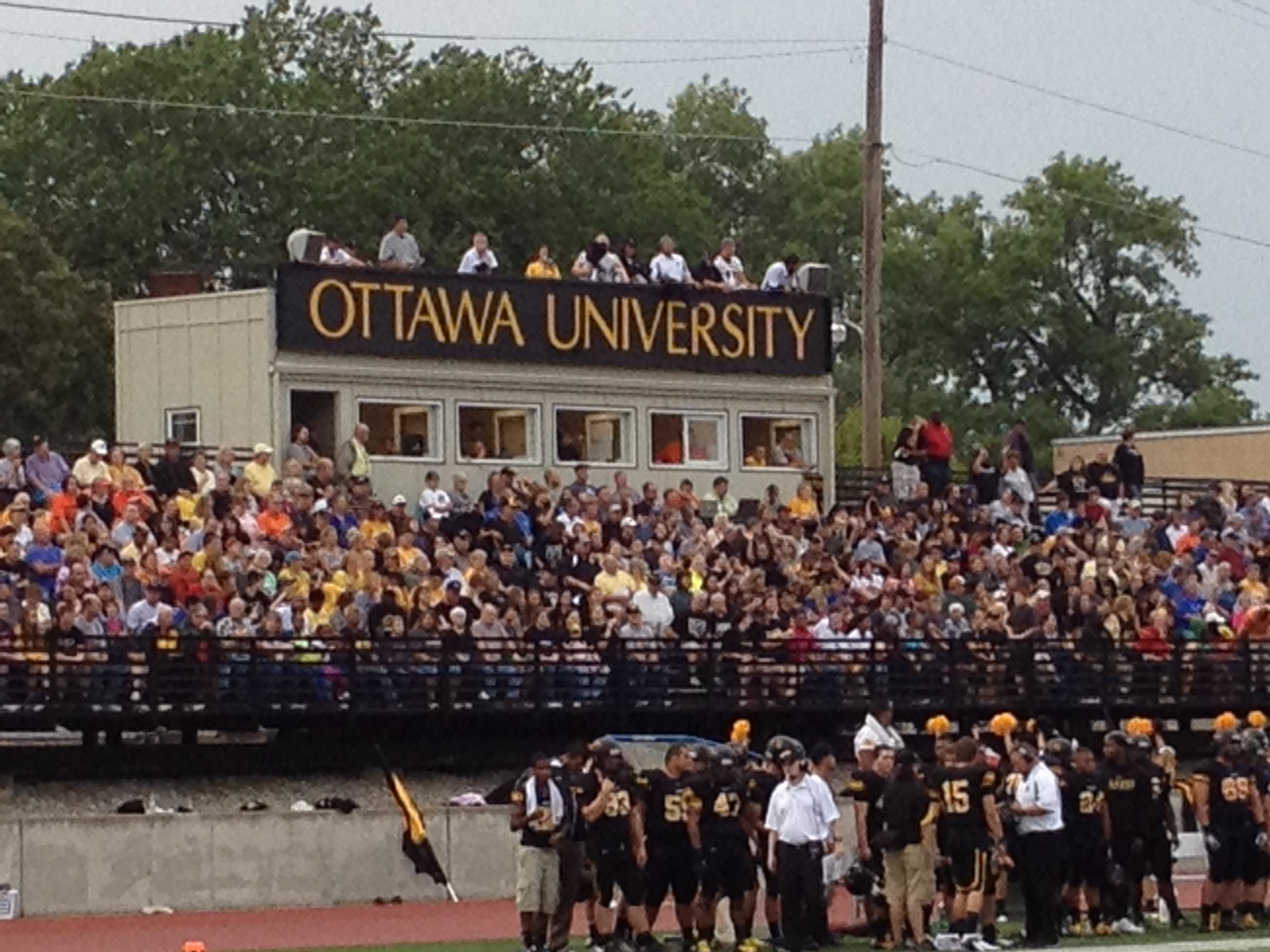
Home stands

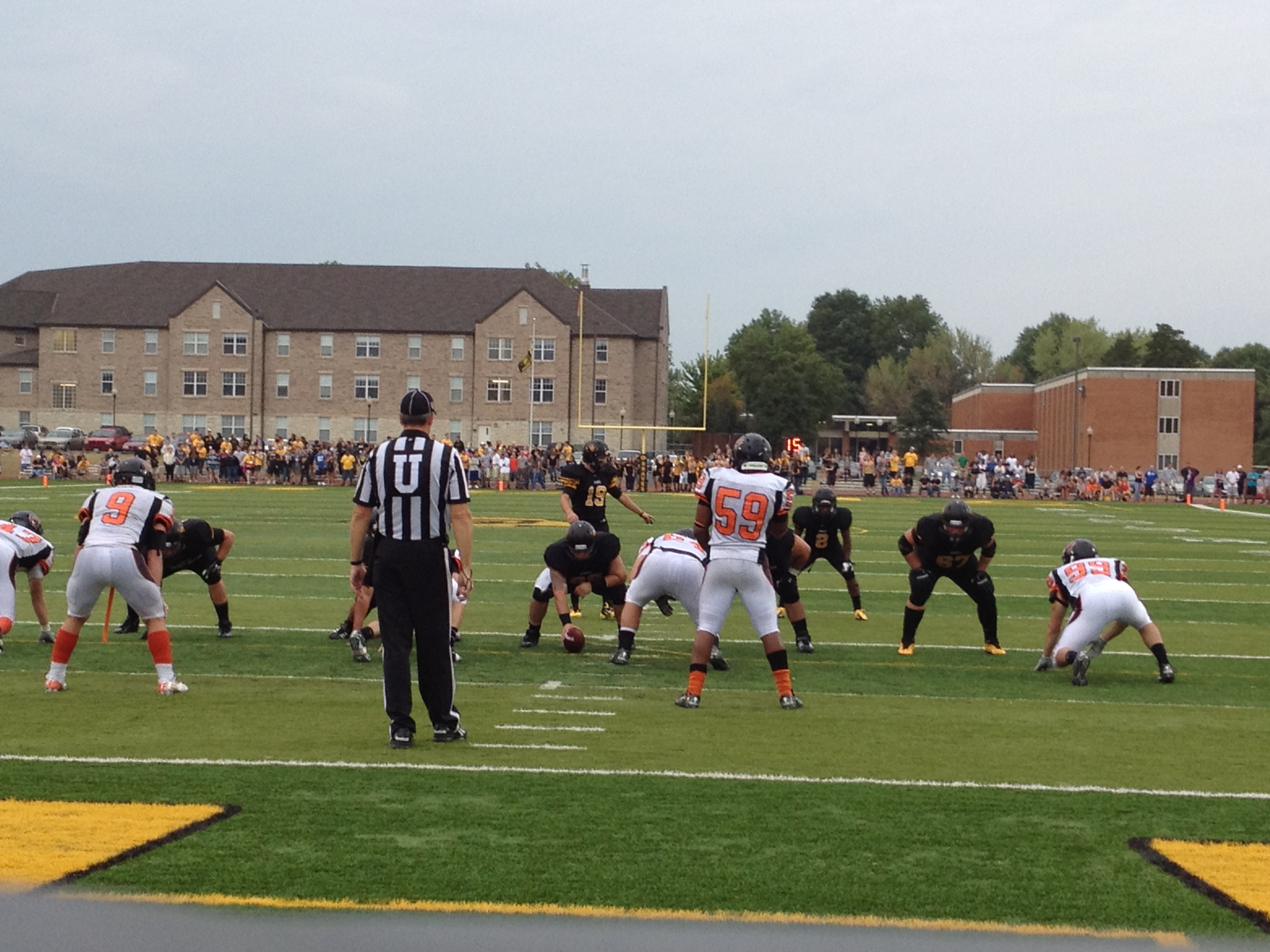
Field level view of game
