= Richard Peters (American football) =

American football player and coach (1920–1973)

Biographical details
- Born: April 7, 1920; Valley Falls, Kansas, U.S.
- Died: May 26, 1973 (aged 53); Manhattan, Kansas, U.S.

Playing career
- 1943–1945: Kansas State

Coaching career (HC unless noted)
- 1946–1948: Ottawa (KS) (assistant)
- 1949–1952: Ottawa (KS)
- 1953–1956: SMU (assistant)
- 1957–1971: Ottawa (KS)
- 1972–1973: Kansas State (assistant)

Head coaching record
- Overall: 129–42–3

Accomplishments and honors

Championships
- 8 KCAC (1950, 1960–1961, 1964–1966, 1970); 1 KCAC North Division (1970)

Awards
- NAIA Hall of Fame (1973); Kansas Sports Hall of Fame (1977)

Richard Peters (April 7, 1920 – May 26, 1973) was an American college football player and coach He served two stints as the head football coach Ottawa University in Ottawa, Kansas, from 1949 to 1952 and 1957 to 1971, compiling a record 129–42–3 (.741). His teams with eight Kansas Collegiate Athletic Conference (KCAC) titles.

Between his two tenures at Ottawa, Peters was an assistant coach at Southern Methodist University (SMU) under Woody Woodard, who had coached against Peters at McPherson College. After his second stint at Ottawa, Peters went to Kansas State University and served as an assistant coach under Vince Gibson until his death, in 1973, of an apparent heart attack. Peters served as President of the NAIA Football Coaches Association from 1964 until 1966 and was inducted into the NAIA Football Hall of Fame in 1973.

== Head coaching record ==
Year	Team	Overall	Conference	Standing	Bowl/playoffs
Ottawa Braves (Kansas Collegiate Athletic Conference) (1949–1952)
1949	Ottawa	5–4	4–2	T–2nd	
1950	Ottawa	7–2	6–0	1st	
1951	Ottawa	6–3	4–2	3rd	
1952	Ottawa	8–1	5–1	2nd	
Ottawa Braves (Kansas Collegiate Athletic Conference) (1957–1970)
1957	Ottawa	4–5	3–4	5th	
1958	Ottawa	3–5–1	3–3–1	3rd	
1959	Ottawa	6–3	6–1	2nd	
1960	Ottawa	9–0	9–0	1st	
1961	Ottawa	9–0	9–0	1st	
1962	Ottawa	8–2	7–2	3rd	
1963	Ottawa	9–1	8–1	2nd	
1964	Ottawa	8–1	8–1	T–1st	
1965	Ottawa	9–0	9–0	1st	
1966	Ottawa	8–1	8–1	T–1st	
1967	Ottawa	8–1	8–1	2nd	
1968	Ottawa	5–4	5–4	T–4th	
1969	Ottawa	5–4	3–2	T–2nd (North)	
1970	Ottawa	7–1–2	5–0	1st (North)	
Ottawa Braves (Heart of America Athletic Conference) (1971)
1971	Ottawa	5–4	4–3	T–3rd	
Ottawa:		129–42–3	114–28–1		
Total:		129–42–3			
National championship Conference title Conference division title or championship game berth

== See also ==
- List of college football career coaching winning percentage leaders
- List of college football head coaches with non-consecutive tenure
