= Glenn Percy =

American football coach

Biographical details
- Born: December 10, 1928 near Carlyle, Kansas, U.S.
- Died: June 23, 2014 (aged 85); Iola, Kansas, U.S.

Coaching career (HC unless noted)
- 1958-1959: Kingman (KS) High School
- 1960–1961: Ponca City HS (OK) (backfield)
- 1964-1967: Field Kindley High School (Coffeyville, KS)
- 1968–1971: Hutchinson HS (KS)
- 1972–1978: Shawnee Mission East HS (KS)
- 1980-1981: Field Kindley HS
- 1982-1983: Wichita West HS (KS)
- 1984–1988: Ottawa (KS)
- 1989–1991: Hutchinson
- 1992–1999: Shawnee Mission East HS (KS)
- 2000: Iola HS (KS)

Head coaching record
- Overall: 21–29 (college); 5–22 (junior college); 128-136-5 (high school)

William Glenn Percy (December 10, 1928 – June 23, 2014) was an American football coach. He served as the head football coach at the Ottawa University in Ottawa, Kansas for five seasons, from 1984 to 1988, compiling a record of 21–29. After working in Ottawa for five seasons, Percy was hired by Hutchinson Community College of the Kansas Jayhawk Community College Conference (KJCCC).

Percy was the head football coach at six Kansas high schools, beginning at Kingman (KS) High School in 1958. He also coached at Hutchinson High School from 1968 to 1971, Wichita West High School from 1982 to 1983 and also had two stints at the head football coach at Field Kindley High School in Coffeyville, Kansas from 1964 to 1967 and 1980 to 1981 as well as at Shawnee Mission East High School in Prairie Village, Kansas, from 1972 to 1978 and 1992 to 1999. He concluded his coaching career at Iola High School in 2000.

== Death and honors ==
Percy died at his home in Iola, Kansas, on June 23, 2014, at the age of 85. He was posthumously inducted into the Greater Kansas City Football Coaches Association Hall of Fame in 2018.

== Head coaching record ==
=== College ===
| Year | Team | Overall | Conference | Standing | Bowl/playoffs |
|---|---|---|---|---|---|
Ottawa Braves (Kansas Collegiate Athletic Conference) (1984–1988)
| 1984 | Ottawa | 5–5 | 5–4 | T–4th | |
| 1985 | Ottawa | 5–5 | 5–4 | 5th | |
| 1986 | Ottawa | 2–8 | 2–7 | T–8th | |
| 1987 | Ottawa | 3–7 | 3–6 | T–6th | |
| 1988 | Ottawa | 6–4 | 5–4 | T–4th | |
| Ottawa: | | 21–29 | 20–25 | | |
| Total: | | 21–29 | | | |

=== Junior college ===
| Year | Team | Overall | Conference | Standing | Bowl/playoffs |
|---|---|---|---|---|---|
Hutchinson Blue Dragons (Kansas Jayhawk Community College Conference) (1989–1991)
| 1989 | Hutchinson | 1–8 | 1–5 | T–6th | |
| 1990 | Hutchinson | 1–8 | 1–5 | T–6th | |
| 1991 | Hutchinson | 3–6 | 1–5 | 6th | |
| Hutchinson: | | 5–22 | 3–15 | | |
| Total: | | 5–22 | | | |
