= Bill Schnebel =

American football coach

William Schnebel

Biographical details
- Born: May 7, 1924; Fremont, Nebraska, U.S.
- Died: December 9, 2002 (aged 78); Alva, Oklahoma, U.S.

Coaching career (HC unless noted)
- 1956–1964: College of Emporia
- 1965–1967: Northwestern State (OK)

Head coaching record
- Overall: 75–39–2
- Bowls: 1–0
- Tournaments: 0–2 (NAIA playoff)

Accomplishments and honors

Championships
- 3 KCAC (1959, 1962–1963)

Awards
- Little All-American coach of the year (1960); NAIA coach of the year (1962)

William Glen Schnebel (May 7, 1924 – December 9, 2002) was an American football coach. He served as the head football coach at the College of Emporia in Emporia, Kansas from 1956 to 1964 and Northwestern State College—now known as Northwestern Oklahoma State University—in Alva, Oklahoma from 1965 to 1967, compiling career college football coaching record of 75–39–2. Schnebel was named the "Little All-American Coach of the Year" in 1960 and NAIA coach of the year in 1962.

== Coaching career ==
=== College of Emporia ===
Schnebel's first head coaching job was at the College of Emporia in Emporia, Kansas. While head coach of the Fighting Presbies, he led his teams to a record of 62–23–1. They won Kansas Collegiate Athletic Conference title three years (1959, 1962, and 1963), took second place in the conference twice (1956 and 1961), and third place in his final season at the college (1964).

Schnebel's team traveled to the Mineral Water Bowl in 1959 and defeated Austin, 21–20. In 1962 C of E was ranked number 3 in the NAIA and lost in the semifinal game to Central State, 20–0. In 1963 C of E was ranked 2nd in the NAIA and lost in the semifinal game to Saint John's, 54–0.

=== Northwest Oklahoma State ===
After his term at the College of Emporia, Schnebel was named the head football coach at Northwestern State College—now known as Northwestern Oklahoma State University—in Alva, Oklahoma.

== Death ==
Schnebel died on December 9, 2002, in Alva.

== Head coaching record ==
Year	Team	Overall	Conference	Standing	Bowl/playoffs
College of Emporia Fighting Presbies (Kansas Collegiate Athletic Conference) (1956–1964)
1956	College of Emporia	7–2	6–1	2nd	
1957	College of Emporia	2–6–1	2–4–1	6th	
1958	College of Emporia	4–5	3–4	T–4th	
1959	College of Emporia	9–1	7–0	1st	W Mineral Water
1960	College of Emporia	5–4	5–4	4th	
1961	College of Emporia	8–1	8–1	2nd	
1962	College of Emporia	10–1	9–0	1st	L NAIA Semifinal
1963	College of Emporia	10–1	9–0	1st	L NAIA Semifinal
1964	College of Emporia	7–2	7–2	T–3rd	
College of Emporia:		62–23–1	56–16–1		
Northwestern State Rangers (Oklahoma Collegiate Conference) (1965–1967)
1965	Northwestern State	3–7	1–6	7th	
1966	Northwestern State	6–3–1	4–2–1	4th	
1967	Northwestern State	4–6	3–4	5th	
Northwestern State:		13–16–1	8–12–1		
Total:		75–39–2			
National championship Conference title Conference division title or championship game berth
