= Edwin Elbel =

American football coach and professor

Biographical details
- Born: November 24, 1895
- Died: July 5, 1983 (aged 87)

Coaching career (HC unless noted)

Football
- 1923–1927: Ottawa (KS)

Basketball
- 1921–1922: Ottawa (KS)
- 1925–1927: Ottawa (KS)

Head coaching record
- Overall: 14–21–7 (football)

Edwin R. Elbel (November 24, 1895 – July 5, 1983) was an American college football and college basketball coach and university professor. He served as the head football at Ottawa University in Ottawa, Kansas, for five seasons, from 1923 to 1927, compiling a record of 14–21–7.

Elbel received a bachelor's degree from Springfield College in 1920 and a second bachelor's from Ottawa in 1925. He later returned to Springfield College and was awarded a master's degree in 1928. The University of Iowa awarded him a Doctor of Philosophy in 1938. In 1928, Elbel joined the faculty at the University of Kansas in the Department of Physical Education and reached full professor status in 1946. He retired in 1966 and died in 1983.

While at the University of Kansas, he kept meticulous records on the height and weight of college students, as well as completing a study of response time before and after exercise.

== Head coaching record ==
=== Football ===
Year	Team	Overall	Conference	Standing	Bowl/playoffs
Ottawa Braves (Kansas Collegiate Athletic Conference) (1923–1927)
1923	Ottawa	5–2–2	4–2–2	6th	
1924	Ottawa	2–6–1	2–6–1	14th	
1925	Ottawa	1–5–2	1–4–2	T–11th	
1926	Ottawa	5–2–1	5–2	5th	
1927	Ottawa	1–6–1	1–5–1	12th	
Ottawa:		14–21–7	13–19–6		
Total:		14–21–7			
