= Red Baughman =

American football coach

Biographical details
- Born: March 14, 1878 near Akron, Ohio, U.S.
- Died: December 19, 1958 (aged 80); Ottawa, Kansas, U.S.
- Education: Ottawa University

Coaching career (HC unless noted)
- 1911: Ottawa (KS)

Head coaching record
- Overall: 1–3–3

Frank Leo "Red" Baughman (March 14, 1878 – December 19, 1958) was an American college football coach. He served as the head football coach at Ottawa University in Ottawa, Kansas for one season, in 1911, compiling a record of 1–3–3.

A native of Ohio, where he was born in 1878, Baughman graduated from the Ottawa University Academy in 1902. He was later a merchant and grocer in the area. He died at a hospital at Ottawa in 1958.
