= Porter Craig =

American sports coach, educator (1888–1977)

Biographical details
- Born: October 24, 1888; Kansas City, Missouri, U.S.
- Died: October 8, 1977 (aged 88); North Kansas City, Missouri, U.S.

Coaching career (HC unless noted)

Football
- 1913–1914: Ottawa (KS)

Basketball
- 1913–1915: Ottawa (KS)

Head coaching record
- Overall: 5–7–2 (football)

William Porter Craig (October 24, 1888 – October 8, 1977) was an American college football and college basketball coach and educator. He served as the head football at Ottawa University in Ottawa, Kansas for two seasons, from 1913 to 1914, compiling a record of 5–7–2. Craig also coached basketball at Ottawa for two seasons. Earlier, he was a prominent track athlete with the Kansas City Athletic Club.

In 1915, Craig accepted a position with the YMCA at Stockton, California. He later taught at Central High School in Kansas City, Missouri. Craig died on October 8, 1977, at North Kansas City Memorial Hospital in North Kansas City, Missouri.

== Head coaching record ==
=== Football ===
Year	Team	Overall	Conference	Standing	Bowl/playoffs
Ottawa Braves (Kansas Collegiate Athletic Conference) (1913–1914)
1913	Ottawa	1–4	0–4	14th	
1914	Ottawa	4–3–2	1–2–1		
Ottawa:		5–7–2	1–6–1		
Total:		5–7–2			
