= Paul J. Andree =

American coach and college athletics administrator

Biographical details
- Born: January 2, 1924; Kansas, U.S.
- Died: November 2, 2014 (aged 90); Albert, Kansas, U.S.

Playing career

Football
- 1947: Fort Hays

Coaching career (HC unless noted)

Football
- 1949–1951: Dodge City (assistant)
- 1952: Dodge City
- 1953–1955: Ottawa (KS)

Track
- 1949–1953: Dodge City

Administrative career (AD unless noted)
- 1955–1956: Ottawa (KS)

Head coaching record
- Overall: 12–14–1 (college football); 8–1 (junior college football)

Paul J. Andree (January 2, 1924 – November 2, 2014) was an American college football and track coach and athletics administrator. He served as the head football coach at Ottawa University in Ottawa, Kansas from 1953 to 1955, compiling a record of 12–14–1. Andree also coached track at Ottawa. He was the school's athletic director from 1955 until his resignation in February 1956.

As a player, Andree was all-conference at Fort Hays State University in Hays, Kansas, for the 1947 season. He began his coaching career at Dodge City Community College in Dodge City, Kansas.

Andree died November 2, 2014, in Albert, Kansas.

== Head coaching record ==
=== College football ===
Year	Team	Overall	Conference	Standing	Bowl/playoffs
Ottawa Braves (Kansas Collegiate Athletic Conference) (1953–1955)
1953	Ottawa	3–6	2–5	T–6th	
1954	Ottawa	6–2–1	5–1–1	2nd	
1955	Ottawa	3–6	2–5	6th	
Ottawa:		12–14–1	9–11–1		
Total:		12–14–1			

=== Junior college ===
Year	Team	Overall	Conference	Standing	Bowl/playoffs
Dodge City Conquistadors (Kansas Jayhawk Junior College Conference) (1952)
1952	Dodge City	8–1	4–1	2nd	
Dodge City:		8–1	4–1		
Total:		8–1			
