= Nyle Salmans =

American football coach

Biographical details
- Born: 1947 or 1948 (age 78–79)

Coaching career (HC unless noted)
- ?–1978: Fort Scott (DC)
- 1979–1983: Ottawa (KS)

Head coaching record
- Overall: 24–26–1

Nyle Salmans is an American former college football coach. He served as the head football coach at Ottawa University in Ottawa, Kansas for five seasons, from 1979 to 1983, compiling a record of 24–26–11.

Prior to taking the job at Ottawa, Salmans was an assistant coach at Fort Scott Community College in Fort Scott, Kansas.

== Head coaching record ==
Year	Team	Overall	Conference	Standing	Bowl/playoffs
Ottawa Braves (Heart of America Athletic Conference) (1979–1981)
1979	Ottawa	5–5	3–3	T–4th	
1980	Ottawa	7–4	5–3	T–3rd	
1981	Ottawa	5–4–1	4–4	5th	
Ottawa Braves (Kansas Collegiate Athletic Conference) (1982–1983)
1982	Ottawa	4–6	4–5	T–6th	
1983	Ottawa	3–7	3–6	T–6th	
Ottawa:		24–26–1	19–21		
Total:		24–26–1			
