= Grover Nutt =

American football coach

Biographical details
- Born: March 31, 1921; Waverly, Kansas, U.S.
- Died: July 24, 2012 (aged 91); Costa Mesa, California, U.S.

Coaching career (HC unless noted)
- 1956: Ottawa (KS)

Head coaching record
- Overall: 0–9

Grover Pleasant Nutt Jr. (March 31, 1921 – July 24, 2012) was an American college football coach. He served as the head football coach at the Ottawa University in Ottawa, Kansas for one season, in 1956, compiling a record of 0–9. He died in 2012.

== Head coaching record ==
Year	Team	Overall	Conference	Standing	Bowl/playoffs
Ottawa Braves (Kansas Collegiate Athletic Conference) (1956)
1956	Ottawa	0–9	0–7	8th	
Ottawa:		0–9	0–7		
Total:		0–9			
