= Court of Industrial Relations (Kansas) =

The Court of Industrial Relations was a three-person tribunal established in Kansas on January 24, 1920 to mediate labor disputes between businesses and labor groups. It was established after a crippling coal miner strike in the state. The United States Supreme Court overturned some of its rulings and it was disbanded in 1925.

Coal miner union leader Alexander Howat, who had led strikes, opposed the court. It was established by the Kansas Legislature as part of the Kansas Industrial Relations Act in 1920. The Act banned strikes, picketing, and the use of boycott in favor of binding rulings from the Court of Industrial Relations to resolve labor disputes.

J. Nort Atkinson was an accountant for the court. Joseph Taggart was appointed by the governor of Kansas to be a judge of the court in 1924.

Chas. Wolff Packing Co. v. Court of Industrial Relations of Kansas was a Supreme Court case involving the court.
