= Nick Davis (American football coach) =

American football coach (born c.1987)

Current position
- Title: Head coach
- Team: Ottawa (KS)
- Conference: KCAC
- Record: 15–29

Biographical details
- Born: c. 1987 (age 38–39); Ashmore, Illinois, U.S.
- Education: Monmouth College (B.A. 2010); Ottawa University (M.Ed. 2011)

Playing career
- 2009: Monmouth (IL)
- Position: Defensive lineman

Coaching career (HC unless noted)

Football
- 2010: Michigan / Western Illinois (S&C intern)
- 2010: Ottawa (KS) (DB)
- 2011: Ottawa (KS) (LB/JV DC)
- 2012–2021: Rose–Hulman (ST/RB/DC/AHC/RC/LB)
- 2021: Ottawa (KS) (DC)
- 2022–present: Ottawa (KS)

Head coaching record
- Overall: 15–29
- Tournaments: 0–1 (NAIA playoffs)

Accomplishments and honors

Championships
- 1 KCAC Bissell Division (2022)

Awards
- AFCA 35 Under 35 (2022)

Nick Davis is an American college football coach. He is the head football coach for Ottawa University in Ottawa, Kansas, a position he has held since 2022.

Davis played college football at Monmouth College during the 2009 season. Listed at 6'4" and 270 pounds, he played along the defensive line for the Fighting Scots and earned Academic All-Conference honors.

In 2022, Davis was selected to the AFCA 35 Under 35 Coaches Leadership Institute.

== Head coaching record ==
=== College ===
Year	Team	Overall	Conference	Standing	Bowl/playoffs
Ottawa Braves (Kansas Collegiate Athletic Conference) (2022–present)
2022	Ottawa	2–8	2–8		
2023	Ottawa	6–6	5–1	T–1st (Bissell)	L NAIA First Round
2024	Ottawa	1–10	1–4	5th (Bissell)	
2025	Ottawa	6–5	4–1	2nd (Kessinger)	
2026	Ottawa	0–0	0–0	(Kessinger)	
Ottawa:		15–29	12–14		
Total:		15–29			
National championship Conference title Conference division title or championship game berth
