= J. Nort Atkinson =

American football coach and politician

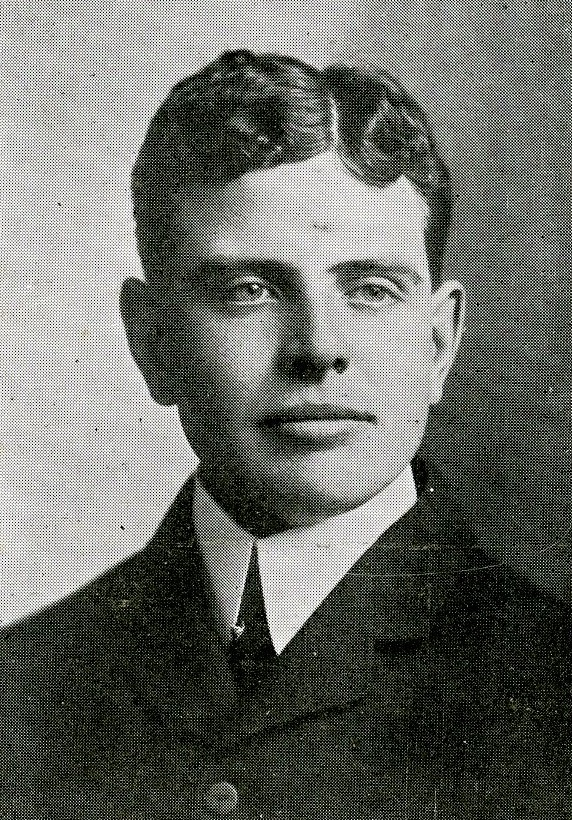
- Atkinson pictured in the Masegun 1902, Ottawa yearbook

Biographical details
- Born: October 6, 1877; Hays, Kansas, U.S.
- Died: March 19, 1939 (aged 61)

Coaching career (HC unless noted)
- 1901–1902: Ottawa (KS)

Head coaching record
- Overall: 12–5–2

James Northrup Atkinson (October 6, 1877 – March 19, 1939) was an American college football coach and politician. He served as the head football coach at Ottawa University in Ottawa, Kansas from 1901 to 1902, and compiled a record of 12–5–2.

Atkinson attended Ottawa University, receiving his A.B. in 1898, B.Sc. in 1900, and A.M. in 1903. He was president of the Ottawa University Alumni Association in 1902. He also did post-graduate studies at Johns Hopkins University, University of Chicago and Columbia University, studying law at the latter. He was admitted to the bar in Kansas after graduating from the Kansas City School of Law in 1902. He was a member of the Phi Gamma Delta fraternity. He later practiced real estate law in Kansas City.

In 1913, Atkinson was elected as a Republican to the Kansas House of Representatives to represent the 9th electoral district, encompassing Kansas City. After serving a single term, he moved to Topeka where he worked for the state government. In 1920, he was appointed the State Accountant of Kansas, which he served until 1921. In 1923, he was named an accountant for the Kansas Court of Industrial Relations. He served another stint as state accountant, and later the Kansas Public Service Commission, initially being appointed in 1925, serving until his resignation in 1927. He later worked as an auditor. He died in 1939.
