= 1960 Ottawa Braves football team =

College football season

1960 Ottawa Braves football

KCAC champion
- Conference: Kansas Collegiate Athletic Conference
- Record: 9–0 (9–0 KCAC)
- Head coach: Richard Peters (8th season)
- Home stadium: Cook Field

1960 Kansas Collegiate Athletic Conference football standings
	Conf.					Overall
Team	W		L		T	W		L		T
Ottawa $	9	–	0	–	0	9	–	0	–	0
Baker	8	–	1	–	0	8	–	1	–	0
Southwestern (KS)	5	–	3	–	1	5	–	3	–	1
College of Emporia	5	–	4	–	0	5	–	4	–	0
Bethany (KS)	4	–	4	–	1	4	–	4	–	1
Bethel (KS)	4	–	4	–	1	4	–	4	–	1
Kansas Wesleyan	4	–	4	–	1	4	–	4	–	1
McPherson	1	–	7	–	1	1	–	7	–	1
Friends	1	–	7	–	1	1	–	8	–	1
Sterling	1	–	8	–	0	1	–	8	–	0
$ – Conference champion

The 1960 Ottawa Braves football team was an American football team that represented Ottawa University of Ottawa, Kansas, as a member of the Kansas Collegiate Athletic Conference (KCAC) during the 1960 NAIA football season. In their eighth season under head coach Richard Peters, the Braves compiled a 9–0 record, won the KCAC championship, and outscored opponents by a total of 339 to 91. The season was part of a 23-game winning streak that began on November 13, 1959, and ended on October 13, 1962, including back-to-back perfect seasons in 1960 and 1961.

The team was led on offense by fullback Herb Sutton who scored 125 points on 17 touchdowns and 23 extra points.

== Schedule ==
Date	Opponent	Site	Result	Source
September 16	at Friends	Wichita, KS	W 53–0	
September 24	Bethel (KS)	Cook Field; Ottawa, KS	W 34–0	
October 1	at Sterling	Sterling, KS	W 62–21	
October 8	College of Emporia	Cook Field; Ottawa, KS	W 46–21	
October 15	at Kansas Wesleyan	Salina, KS	W 39–20	
October 22	at Southwestern (KS)	Winfield, KS	W 13–7	
October 29	McPherson	Cook Field; Ottawa, KS	W 30–0	
November 4	at Bethany (KS)	Lindsborg, KS	W 46–14	
November 12	Baker	Cook Field; Ottawa, KS	W 14–8	
