= 1961 Ottawa Braves football team =

College football season

1961 Ottawa Braves football

KCAC champion
- Conference: Kansas Collegiate Athletic Conference
- Record: 9–0 (9–0 KCAC)
- Head coach: Richard Peters (9th season)
- Home stadium: Cook Field

1961 Kansas Collegiate Athletic Conference football standings
	Conf.					Overall
Team	W		L		T	W		L		T
No. 16 Ottawa $	9	–	0	–	0	9	–	0	–	0
College of Emporia	8	–	1	–	0	8	–	1	–	0
Southwestern (KS)	6	–	2	–	1	6	–	2	–	1
Baker	6	–	3	–	0	6	–	3	–	0
Bethany (KS)	3	–	4	–	2	3	–	4	–	2
Kansas Wesleyan	4	–	5	–	0	4	–	5	–	0
Bethel (KS)	3	–	6	–	0	3	–	6	–	0
McPherson	3	–	6	–	0	3	–	6	–	0
Sterling	1	–	8	–	0	1	–	8	–	0
Friends	0	–	8	–	1	0	–	8	–	1
$ – Conference champion; Rankings from NAIA poll

The 1961 Ottawa Braves football team was an American football team that represented Ottawa University of Ottawa, Kansas, as a member of the Kansas Collegiate Athletic Conference (KCAC) during the 1961 college football season. In their ninth season under head coach Richard Peters, the Braves compiled a 9–0 record, won the KCAC championship, and outscored opponents by a total of 289 to 42. It was the third undefeated season in Ottawa football history. The season was also part of a 23-game winning streak that began on November 13, 1959, and ended on October 13, 1962, including back-to-back perfect seasons in 1960 and 1961.

Mike Brown led the KCAC in scoring with 73 points on four touchdowns, 34 extra points, and five field goals. He also won NAIA All-America honors as a defensive end.

The team played its home games at Cook FieldOttawa, Kansas.

== Schedule ==
Date	Opponent	Site	Result	Source
September 16	Friends	Cook Field; Ottawa, KS	W 28–0	
September 23	at Bethel (KS)	North Newton, KS	W 20–0	
September 29	Sterling	Cook Field; Ottawa, KS	W 37–0	
October 7	at College of Emporia	Emporia, KS	W 20–10	
October 14	Kansas Wesleyan	Cook Field; Ottawa, KS	W 38–13	
October 21	Southwestern (KS)^{†}	Cook Field; Ottawa, KS	W 42–0	
October 27	at McPherson	McPherson, KS	W 34–0	
November 3	Bethany	Cook Field; Ottawa, KS	W 28–6	
November 11	at Baker	Baldwin City, KS	W 42–13	
^{†}Homecoming

== Statistics ==
Ottawas led the KCAC in rushing offense with an average of 250.5 rushing yards per game. They ranked second in total offense with an average of 334.6 yards per game. Defensively, they led the conference in total defense (162. yards), rushing defense (117.7 yards per game), and passing defense (44.4 yards per game).

Ottawa's Mike Brown led the conference in scoring with 73 points on four touchdowns, 34 extra points, and five field goals. He successfully converted 21 consecutive extra point kicks.

== Awards and honors ==
Mike Brown was a first-team pick as a defensive end on the NAIA All-America football team.

Ottawa players took 10 spots on the KCAC all-star offensive and defensive teams selected by the conference coaches. Mike Brown and Bill Shook were included on both offensive and defensive teams. The honorees were:

- Mike Brown - end (offense), linebacker (defense)
- Bill Shook - guard (offense), linebacker (defense)
- Clarence Whitesell tackle (offense)
- Pat Jeffereson - guard (offense)
- Jerry Lawson - center (offense)
- Jim King - linebacker (defense)
- Ken Smart - defensive back
- Jon McAninch - defensive back

== Playerws ==
The following 35 players received football letters for their participation on the 1961 team:

- Duane Bissett, freshman
- Mike Brown, senior
- Bruce Bundy, freshman
- Arlys Carter, senior
- Steve Coe, freshman
- Dan Coons, freshman
- Richard Esterlund, freshman
- Val Finney, sophomore
- Jerry Freeman, freshman
- Dave Gerber, freshman
- Ed Hampton, sophomore
- Jerry Harshaw, freshman
- Pat Jefferson, junior
- Jim King, co-captain, senior
- John Krebbs, freshman
- Jerry Lawson, senior
- John McAninch, co-captain, junior
- Roger Moore, sophomore
- Bob Ord, sophomore
- Bruce Pemberton, senior
- Dennis Powers, sophomore
- Warren Rinehart, sophomore
- Bob Rose, freshman
- Gene Sacha, sophomore
- Con Schuyler, sophomore
- Floyd Scott, freshman
- Jim Shafer, sophomore
- Bill Shook, co-captain, senior
- Ken Smart, sophomore
- Ron Smith, freshman
- Richard Spong, sophomore
- David Stotts, sophomore
- Fred Thompson, junior
- Clarence Whitesell, co-captain, senior
- Larry Young, freshman
