= Ottawa Braves =

Athletics of Ottawa University, Kansas

- University: Ottawa University
- Conference: KCAC; Franklin "Gene" Bissell Division
- NAIA: Region IV
- Athletic director: Donald Anderson, Jay Kahnt
- Location: Ottawa, Kansas
- Varsity teams: 31
- Football stadium: AdventHealth Field
- Basketball arena: Wilson Field House
- Baseball stadium: Dick Peters Complex
- Softball stadium: Dick Peters Complex
- Soccer stadium: AdventHealth Field
- Lacrosse stadium: AdventHealth Field
- Sailing venue: AdventHealth Field
- Tennis venue: Dick Peters Complex
- Volleyball arena: Wilson Field House
- Nickname: Braves
- Colors: Black and gold
- Website: ottawabraves.com

The Ottawa Braves are the athletic teams that represent Ottawa University, located in Ottawa, Kansas, in intercollegiate sports as a member of the National Association of Intercollegiate Athletics (NAIA), primarily competing in the Kansas Collegiate Athletic Conference (KCAC) since the 1982–83 academic year; which they were a member on a previous stint from their charter member days in 1902–03 to 1970–71). The Braves previously competed as a charter member of the Heart of America Athletic Conference (HAAC) from 1971–72 to 1981–82.

== Varsity teams ==
Ottawa competes in 31 intercollegiate varsity athletic teams:

| Men's sports | Women's sports |
|---|---|
| Baseball | Basketball |
| Basketball | Beach volleyball |
| Bowling | Bowling |
| Cross country | Cross country |
| Football | Flag football |
| Golf | Golf |
| Lacrosse | Lacrosse |
| Powerlifting | Powerlifting |
| Soccer | Soccer |
| Tennis | Softball |
| Track and field | Stung |
| Volleyball | Tennis |
| Wrestling | Track and field |
| | Volleyball |
| | Wrestling |

=== Football ===
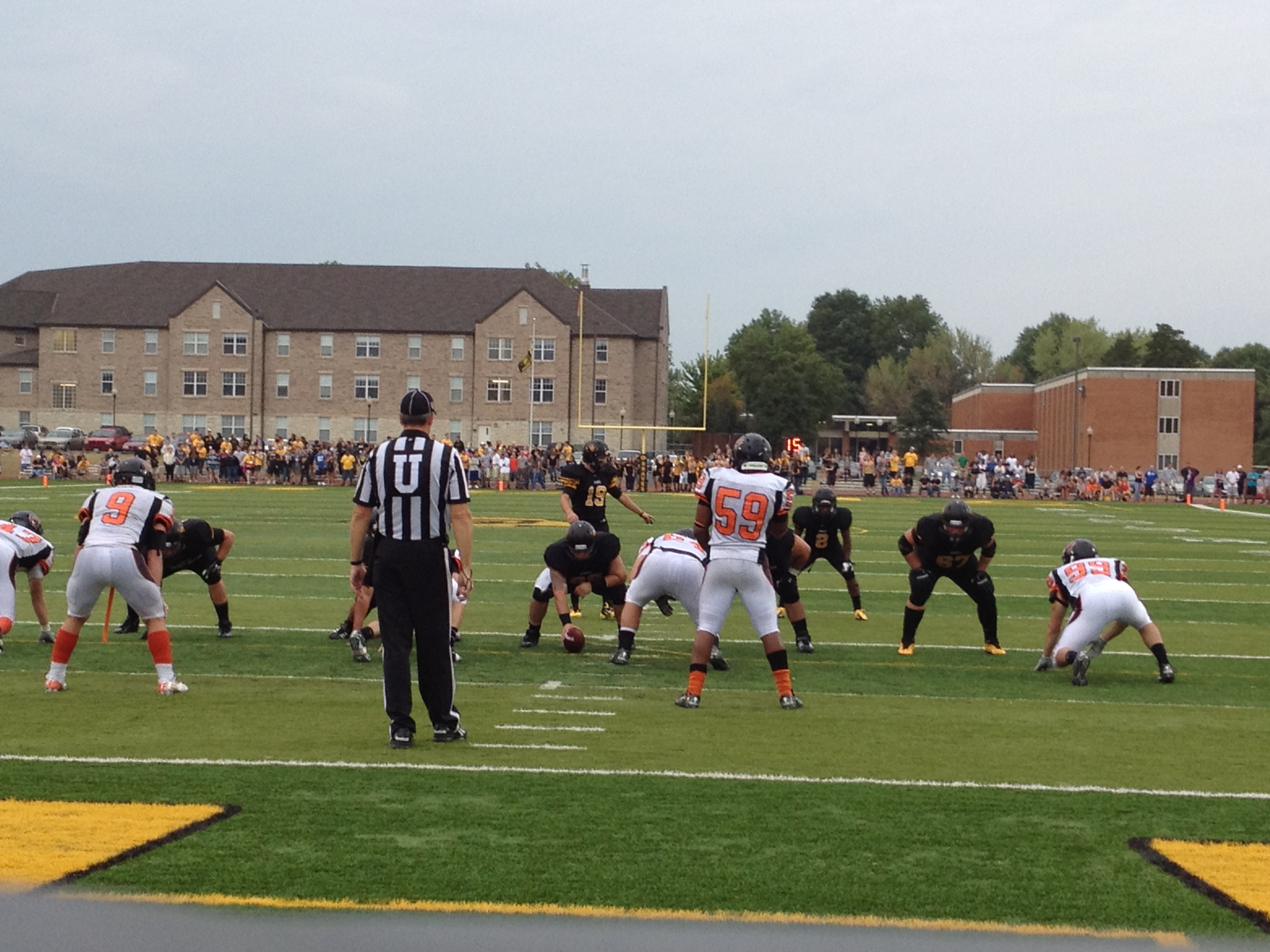
The Braves Offense line up against rival Baker Wildcats on August 25, 2012.

Ottawa University first put a football team on the field in 1891. As of the conclusion of the 2008 season, the total record of the football team is 132 years, 1,135 games, 597 victories, 491 defeats, 47 ties. Ottawa has won the KCAC Conference Championship 21 times and the Heart of America Athletic Conference 1 time. The current football coach is Nick Davis, who took over starting in 2022.

The team plays their games at AdventHealth Field

==== Bowl games and postseason play ====
In 1972, Ottawa defeated the Friends University Falcons in the Mineral Water Bowl by a score of 27–20.

Ottawa's football team has qualified for the 1997, 2000, 2003, 2009, 2010, 2011 2012, 2013, 2014 and 2023 NAIA Football National Championship playoffs.

== Facilities ==
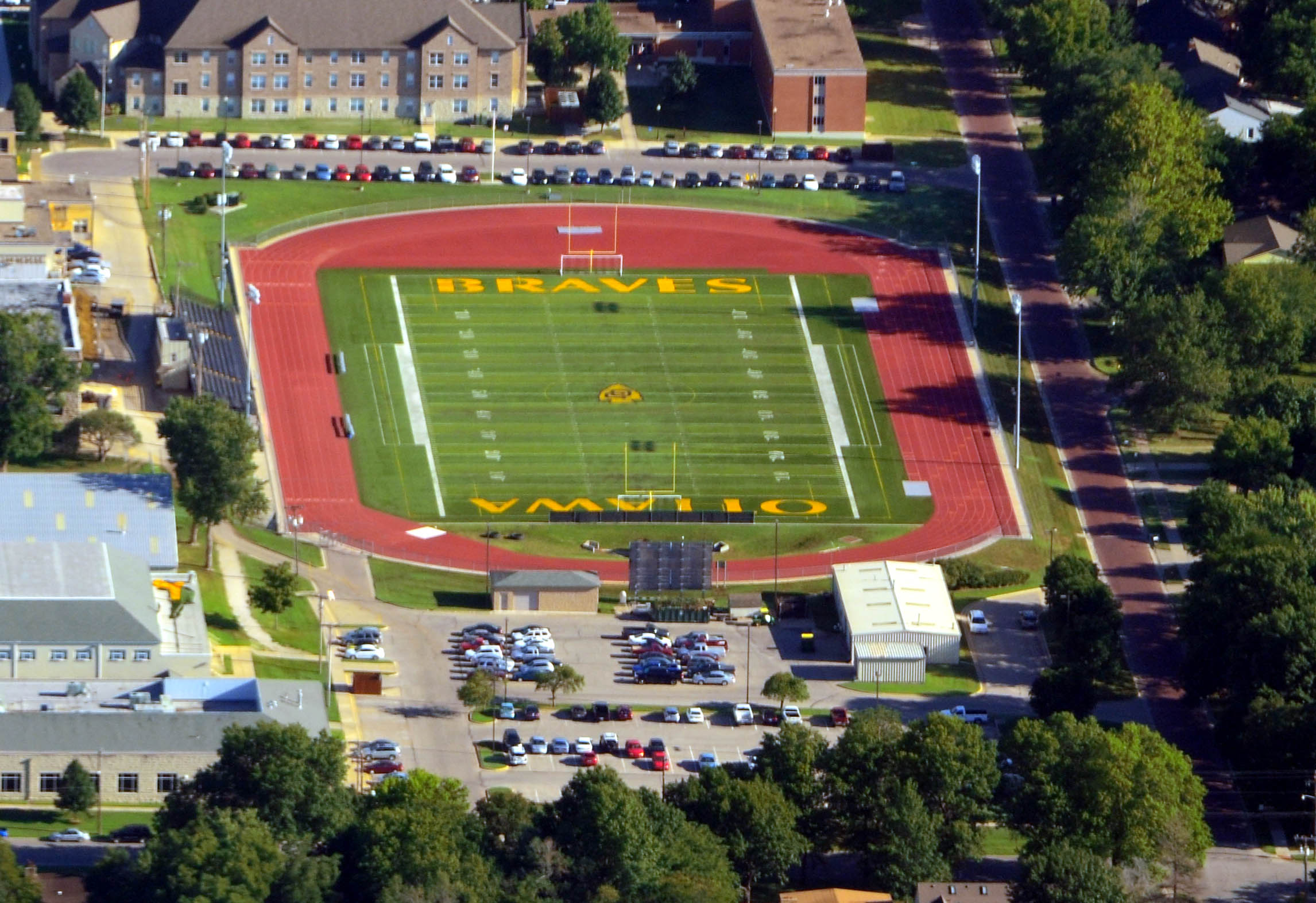
AdventHealth Field

| Venue | Sport(s) | Ref. |
|---|---|---|
| AdventHealth Field | Football; Soccer; Lacrosse; Track and field | |
| Dick Peters Complex | Baseball; Softball; Tennis | |
| Wilson Field House | Basketball; Volleyball; Wrestling | |
| Hull Center | (training) | |
