= Portland station =

Portland station may refer to:

== Australia ==
- Portland railway station, Victoria

== United States ==
- Portland Transportation Center, a bus and Amtrak train station in Portland, Maine
- Union Station (Portland, Maine), 1888–1960
- Portland Union Station, in Portland, Oregon

== United Kingdom ==
- Portland railway station (England), in Portland, Dorset

== See also ==
- Portland (disambiguation)
- Portland Fire Station No. 7, in Portland, Oregon, U.S.
- Portland Fire Station No. 23, in Portland, Oregon, U.S.
- Great Portland Street tube station, in London, England
- List of TriMet transit centers in Portland, Oregon metropolitan area, U.S.
