= Tualatin Valley Fire and Rescue =

Regional fire district in Oregon

Tualatin Valley Fire & Rescue

Operational area
- Country: US
- State: Oregon
- Counties: Washington; Clackamas; Multnomah; Yamhill; 45.4334°N 122.7494°W

Agency overview
- Established: 1989
- Employees: 500
- Annual budget: $197 million (2017)
- Staffing: Combination
- Fire chief: Deric Weiss
- EMS level: ALS and BLS

Facilities and equipment
- Divisions: 2
- Battalions: 3
- Stations: 28
- Engines: 37
- Trucks: 6
- Squads: 4
- Rescues: 1
- Ambulances: 13
- Tenders: 11
- HAZMAT: 5
- Wildland: 16
- Fireboats: 3

Website
- www.tvfr.com

Tualatin Valley Fire & Rescue (TVF&R) is a special-purpose government fire fighting and emergency services district in the Portland metropolitan area of Oregon. Established in 1989 with a merger between Washington County Fire District 1 and the Tualatin Rural Fire Protection District, it primarily provides fire and emergency medical services in eastern Washington County, but also provides services in neighboring Multnomah, Clackamas, and Yamhill counties. It serves unincorporated areas along with the cities of Beaverton, Tigard, Tualatin, West Linn, Wilsonville, and Sherwood, among others. With over 450 firefighters and 28 fire stations, the district is the second largest fire department in the state and has an annual budget of $197 million.

== History ==
Beaverton incorporated in 1893, and by 1914 had a volunteer fire department. To the south, Tualatin incorporated in 1913 and on February 2, 1935, formed the Tualatin Fire Department. Residents of unincorporated West Slope contracted with Beaverton’s fire department to have the latter provide service starting in 1941, but created their own West Slope Rural Fire Protection District in 1949.

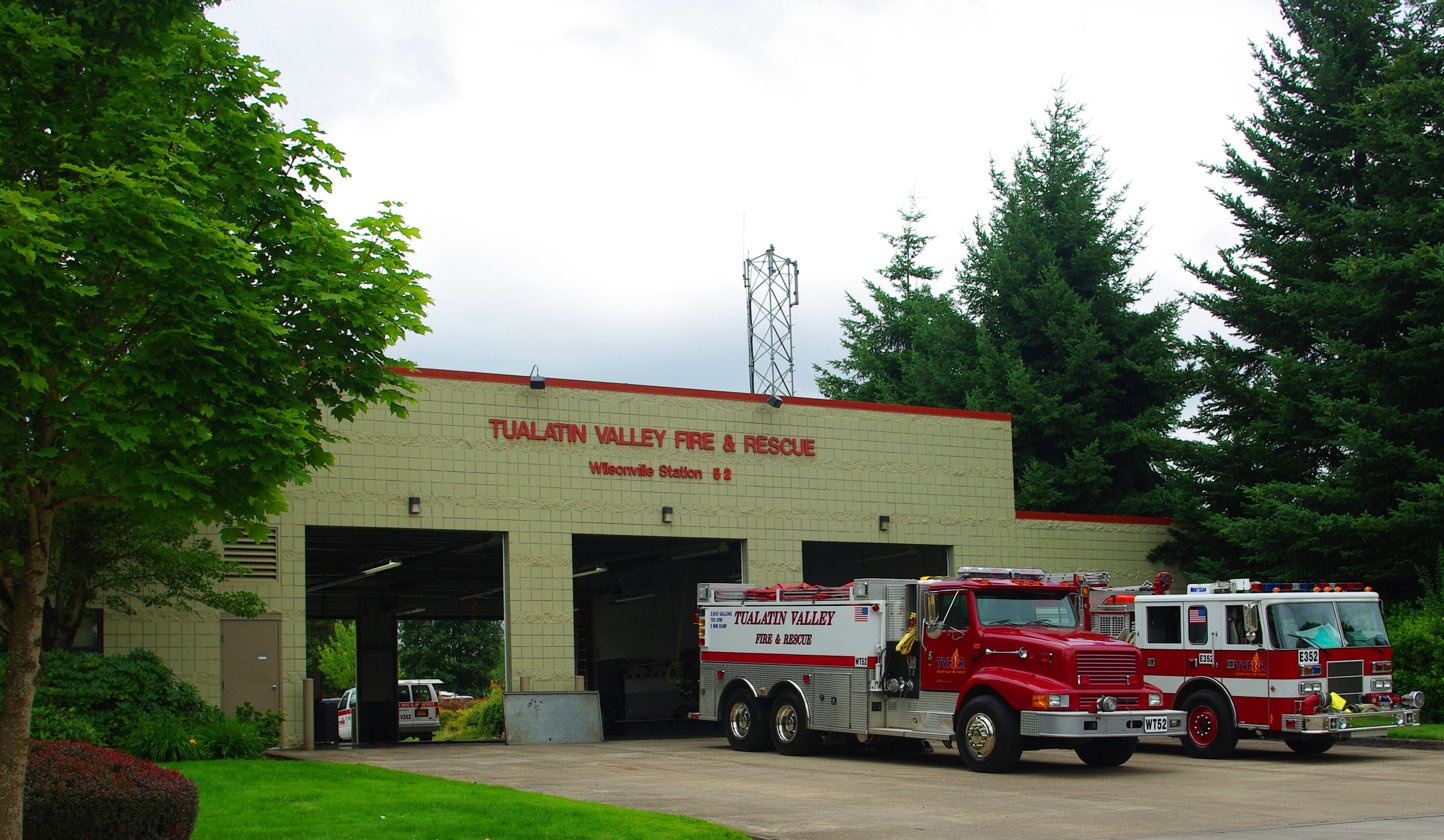
One of two stations in Wilsonville

In 1946, the Tualatin department became the Tualatin Rural Fire Protection District and opened a new station on Boones Ferry Road, and in 1948 the Stafford-Wilsonville Fire Department merged into the new rural district. Also in 1946, the Cedar Mill Rural Fire Protection District was created, followed by the Beaverton Rural Fire Protection District in 1947 that covered the Aloha area. The Beaverton Rural district contracted with Beaverton for services, with the original station on 185th at Blanton across from the post office. A second station was opened in 1965 in the Progress area, with a third opening adjacent to Tektronix on Jenkins Road in 1967.

Sherwood merged their fire department with Tualatin Rural in 1968. Municipal fire departments in Tigard and King City, and Sherwood later joined the Tualatin Rural Fire Protection District. In 1972, Washington County Fire District 1 was created with the merger of the Beaverton Rural, Cedar Mill Rural, and the West Slope Rural fire districts.

Washington County Fire District 1 and the Tualatin Rural Fire Protection District began discussing a merger in 1985, and in November 1988 the two districts signed off on the plan with a preliminary name of as Consolidated Fire and Rescue District. The name Tualatin Valley Fire & Rescue was adopted by the new entity in January 1989, and the district was officially created in February 1989. The new district covered 225 square miles (580 km^{2}) with 176,040 residents and had 17 fire stations. WCFD1 covered 110 square miles (280 km^{2}) with about 122,040 people in eastern and northern Washington County including Beaverton, Metzger, Garden Home, Aloha, Reedville, Bonnie Slope, Oak Hills, West Slope, Raleigh Hills, Rockcreek, and part of Tigard. Tualatin Rural covered 115 square miles (300 km^{2}) with about 54,000 people in southern Washington County and western Clackamas County including Tualatin, Wilsonville, King City, Sherwood, Durham, Rivergrove, as the rest of Tigard. WCFD1 had eight fire stations with 126 firefighters, while Tualatin Rural had seven fire stations with 100 firefighters.

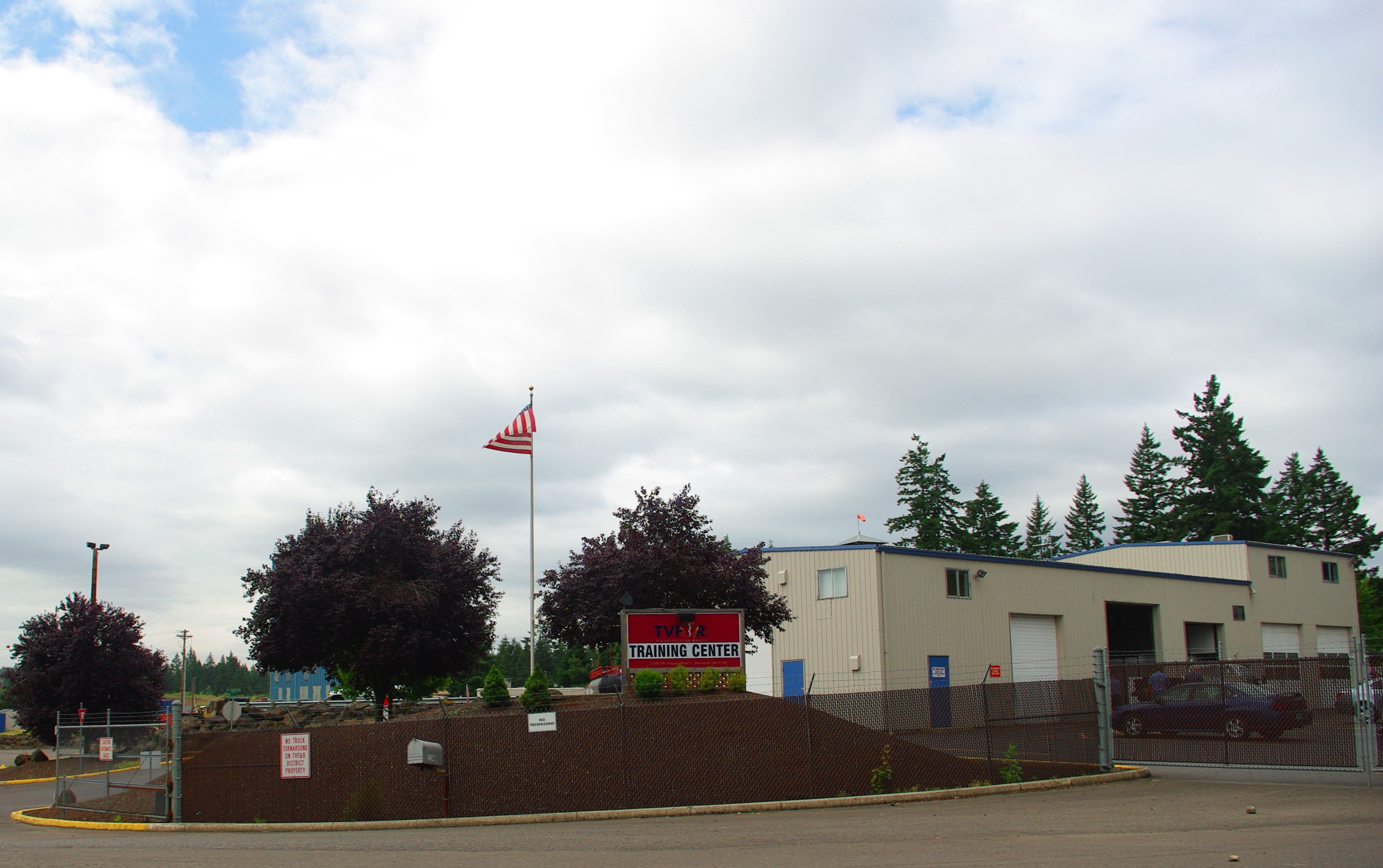
Training Center on Tonquin Road between Sherwood, Wilsonville, and Tualatin

Prior to the merger, Washington County Fire District 1 signed an agreement with Hillsboro in 1987 in which TVF&R would not oppose annexations by the city that would remove properties from the district. The agreement also could have led to a merger with the Hillsboro Fire Department. The next year the district and Hillsboro agreed to have WCFD1 continue providing service in the recently annexed Tanasbourne neighborhood for five years.

In April 1989, the new district opened a training facility. Washington County Fire District 2 (WCFD2) started negotiations in October 1989 with TVF&R for a partial merger, though the merger never occurred. At that time TVF&R maintained WCFD2’s equipment, along with Hillsboro’s equipment. Multnomah County Fire Districts 4 and 20, plus the Valley View Water District, merged into TVF&R in 1995. Beaverton voters finally approved an official merger into the district in 1996.

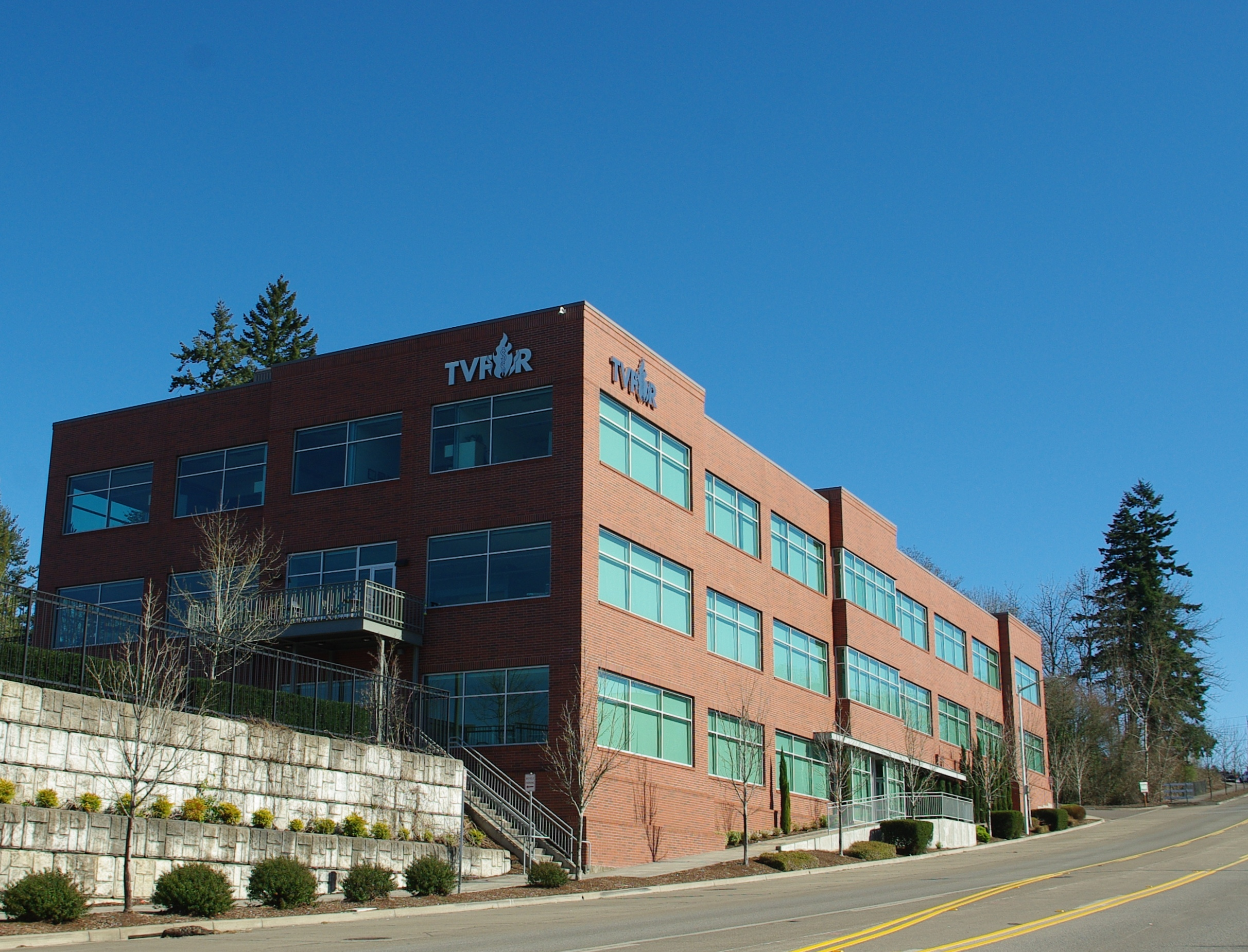
Headquarters in Tigard

West Linn contracted TVF&R for fire services in 1998, and then joined the district in 2004. Oregon City contracted with TVF&R from 1999 to 2003. In 1999, TVF&R was awarded the International Association of Fire Chiefs' Fire Service Award for Excellence for its Community Assistance Program. The district achieved national accreditation in August 2000 by the Commission on Fire Accreditation International. Rosemont Fire District in West Linn became part of the district in 2001. In 2006, its Apartment Program led to the International Association of Fire Chiefs' awarding the Fire Service Award for Excellence to TVF&R.

== Apparatus and stations ==
Apparatus operated by the district includes 37 engines, 6 trucks, 11 water tenders, plus specialty equipment such as 5 HAZMAT trucks, 3 rescue boats, 13 EMS units, 4 technical rescue vehicles, and 4 elevated waterway units. In 2017, TVF&R responded to 1,362 fires and 33,390 medical emergencies, among the 49,211 total calls for service.

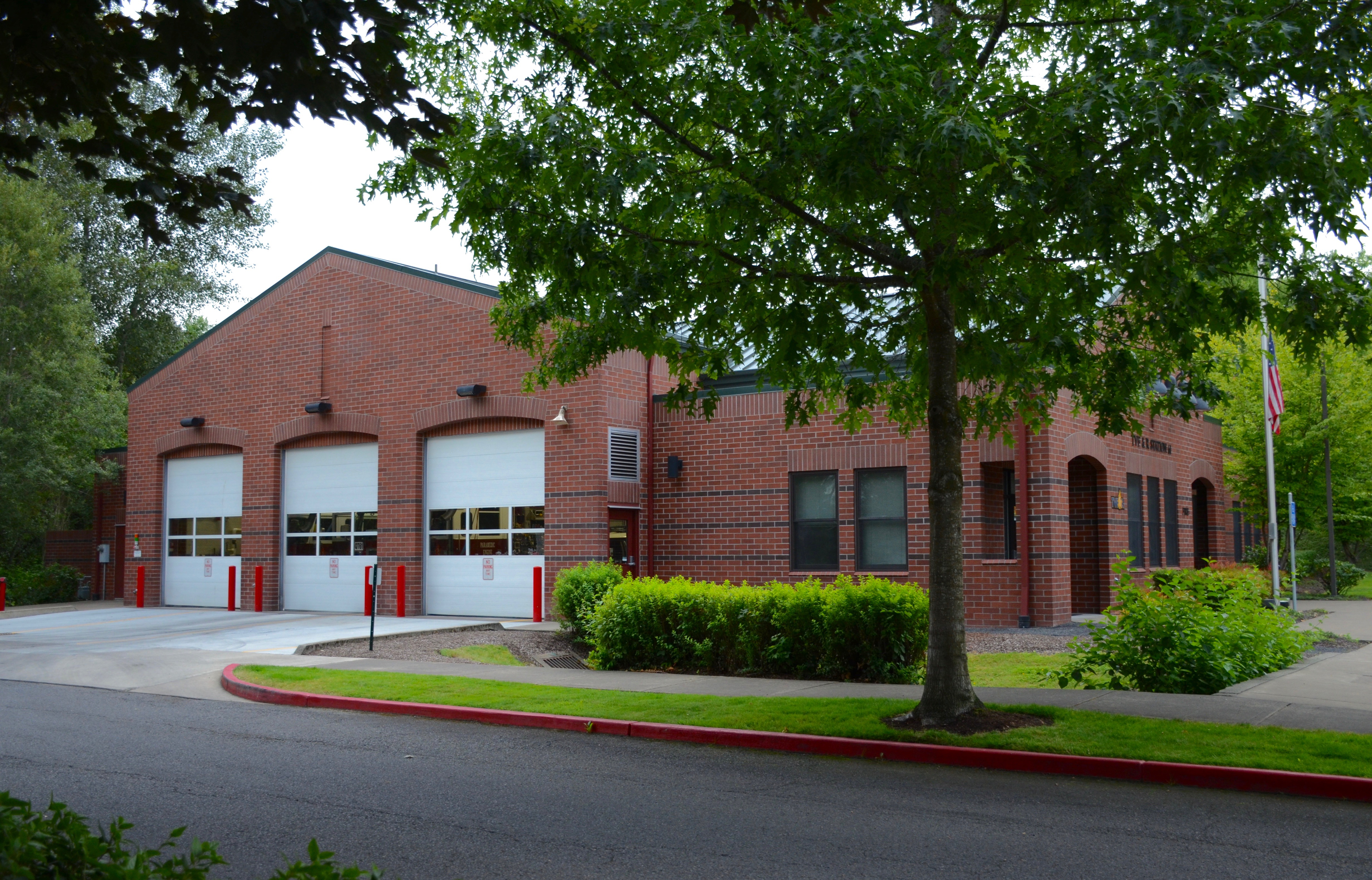
Station 61, one of five in Beaverton, was opened in 2000.

The district operates 29 fire stations across the area. This includes two in Wilsonville, three in West Linn, one each in Tualatin and Sherwood, two in Tigard, one in King City, five in Beaverton, one in the Stafford area, one on Cooper Mountain, one in Aloha-Reedville, one each in the Rock Creek and Bethany areas, two in the West Hills, one in North Plains, and two in Newberg. In October 2015 TVF&R added its first mini-station in Raleigh Hills. In addition to the fire stations, the district operates a training center between Tualatin and Wilsonville and three operations centers, of which the one in Tigard also serves as the main command center. In January 2019, TVF&R started construction of a new station, located in the Rivergrove area just north of Meridian Park Hospital. Station 39 was completed in January 2020.

=== Fire stations and offices ===
List of fire stations & offices of Tualatin Valley Fire and Rescue
Fire Station #	Location	Address	Engine Company	Truck Company	Rescue Units	Special/Support Units	Chief Units	Ref.
17	North Plains	31370 NW Commercial Street, North Plains, OR	Engine 17			Brush 17		
19	Midway	15200 SW Midway Road, Hillsboro, OR	Engine 19			Heavy Brush 19		
20	Newberg	414 E 2nd Street, Newberg, OR	Engine 20		Rescue 20 Medic 20	Water Rescue 20 Heavy Brush 20		
21	Newberg	3100 Middlebrook Drive, Newberg, OR	Engine 21	Truck 21	Medic 21	Brush 21	Battalion Chief 7	
33	Sherwood	15440 SW Oregon Street, Sherwood, OR	Engine 33			Brush 33		
34	Tualatin	19365 SW 90th Court, Tualatin, OR	Engine 34		Car 34	Hazmat 34		
35	King City	17135 SW Pacific Highway, King City, OR	Engine 35		Medic 35			
39	Lake Oswego	7080 SW McEwan Road, Lake Oswego, OR	Engine 39			Rehab 39 Squad 39	Battalion Chief 6	
50	Tigard	12617 SW Walnut Street, Tigard, OR	Engine 50			Water Tender 50A Water Tender 50B Rehab 350 (Volunteer)		
51	Tigard	8935 SW Burnham Street, Tigard, OR	Engine 51	Truck 51 (Platform)		Heavy Rescue 51 USAR 51 REM 51		
52	Wilsonville	29875 SW Kinsman Road, Wilsonville, OR 97070	Engine 52			CBRNE 52 Heavy Brush 52		
53	Beaverton	8480 SW Scholls Ferry Road, Beaverton, OR 97008	Engine 53		Car 53	Hazmat 53		
54	Wilsonville	8995 SW Miley Road, #105, Wilsonville, OR 97070			Rescue 54			
55	West Linn	20790 Hidden Springs Road, West Linn, OR 97068	Engine 55	Truck 55 (TDA)				
56	Wilsonville	8445 SW Elligsen Road, Wilsonville, OR 97070	Engine 56	Truck 56				
57	West Linn	24242 SW Mountain Road, West Linn, OR 97068	Engine 57			Brush 57		
58	West Linn	6050 Failing Street, West Linn, OR 97068	Engine 58			Heavy Brush 58 Mobile Command Center		
59	West Linn	1860 Willamette Falls Drive, West Linn, OR 97068	Engine 59			Water Rescue 59		
60	Beaverton/Portland	8585 NW Johnson Street, Portland, OR 97229	Engine 60			Brush 60		
61	Beaverton	13740 SW Butner Road, Beaverton, OR 97005	Engine 61					
62	Aloha	3608 SW 209th Avenue, Aloha, OR 97007	Engine 62			Water Tender 62A Water Tender 62B		
64	Beaverton/Portland	3355 NW 185th Avenue, Portland, OR 97229	Engine 64		Rescue 64	Heavy Brush 64		
65	Beaverton	3425 SW 103rd Avenue, Beaverton, OR 97005	Engine 65			Water Tender 65A Water Tender 65B		
66	Beaverton	13900 SW Brockman Road, Beaverton, OR 97008	Engine 66					
67	Beaverton	13810 SW Farmington Road, Beaverton, OR 97005	Engine 67	Truck 67 (TDA)			Battalion Chief 5	
68	Beaverton/Portland	13545 NW Evergreen Street, Portland, OR 97229	Engine 68	Truck 68 (TDA)				
69	Aloha	9940 SW 175th Avenue, Aloha, OR 97007	Engine 69			Heavy Brush 69		
70	Beaverton/Portland	8299 SW Beaverton-Hillsdale Highway, Portland, OR 97225				Squad 70		
72	Portland	11646 NW Skyline Boulevard, Portland, OR 97231	E 372 (Volunteer)					
CBOC (Command & Business Operations Center)		11945 SW 70th Avenue, Tigard, OR 97223						
Logistics Service Center		9941 SW Avery Street, Tualatin, OR 97062						
SOC (South Operating Center)		8455 SW Elligsen Road, Wilsonville, OR 97070						
TVF&R Training Center		12400 SW Tonquin Road, Sherwood, OR 97140						

== Organization ==
TVF&R serves about 520,000 people in Washington, Clackamas, Multnomah, and Yamhill counties on Portland’s Westside, mostly in the Tualatin Valley. The district is the second largest fire department in Oregon after Portland's Fire Bureau, and is the largest fire district in Oregon. Cities in the district are Beaverton, Durham, King City, Newberg, North Plains, Rivergrove, Sherwood, Tigard, Tualatin, and West Linn. It also covers unincorporated areas such as Aloha, Cedar Mill, Bethany, Rockcreek, including most of eastern Washington County. Accredited by the Commission on Fire Accreditation International (CFAI), TVF&R has a five-member board of directors elected by residents that govern the district. As of 2018, the district had 416 paid fire fighters and paramedics, 67 volunteers, 16 prevention and 7 training staff, and 108 administration and support personnel.

== See also ==
- Firefighting in Oregon
