= Hillsboro Fire Department =

Fire department in Oregon, US

Coordinates: 45°31′22″N 122°59′23″W

Hillsboro Fire & Rescue

Operational area
- Country: United States
- State: Oregon
- City: Hillsboro

Agency overview
- Established: 1880
- Annual calls: 11816 (2020)
- Employees: 123
- Annual budget: 27 million (FY 20-21)
- Staffing: Career
- Fire chief: David Downey
- IAFF: 2210

Facilities and equipment
- Stations: 5
- Engines: 5
- Trucks: 1
- Rescues: 1
- Tenders: 1
- Wildland: 2 (Type 6)

Website
- www.hillsboro-oregon.gov/fire
- www.iaff2210.org

Hillsboro Fire & Rescue is the municipal fire department for the city of Hillsboro in the U.S. state of Oregon. Founded in 1880, the department operates five stations with six companies. The department has 123 members and is led by Chief David Downey.

== History ==
On May 3, 1880, the City's board of trustees (now city council) passed an ordinance to organize the first fire department, which was originally a hook and ladder company. The ordinance also authorized the digging of a well in the public square, and the department soon acquired a horse-drawn ladder truck for $1,600. The foreman of the Hook & Ladder Company requested the city council provide additional equipment in January 1894. Items requested included lanterns, a heavy iron hook, and axes with hooks on the pole, which was to add to the existing equipment that included the ladder truck and several hose carts. The city purchased a hand engine from Albany, Oregon, in 1890 for $400. In 1894, the Hillsboro Coffee Club organized to support what was then a volunteer fire department.

=== Twentieth century ===
The department then bought a two-cylinder chemical engine in 1908, adding to the hook and ladder and two hose carts the department already had. The city also installed a steel water reservoir that year to improve water pressure. A nozzle belonging to one of the first pieces of equipment owned by the department was later uncovered during an excavation in 1911. The nozzle had been part of a pump engine originally used by the Sacramento Fire Department and later used by the Portland Fire Bureau and the City of Albany. One of the early fires was in January 1912 when the Commercial Hotel at Second and Washington burned, with two fatalities. The city built a new city hall in 1914 on Second Avenue, and the department moved into the building.

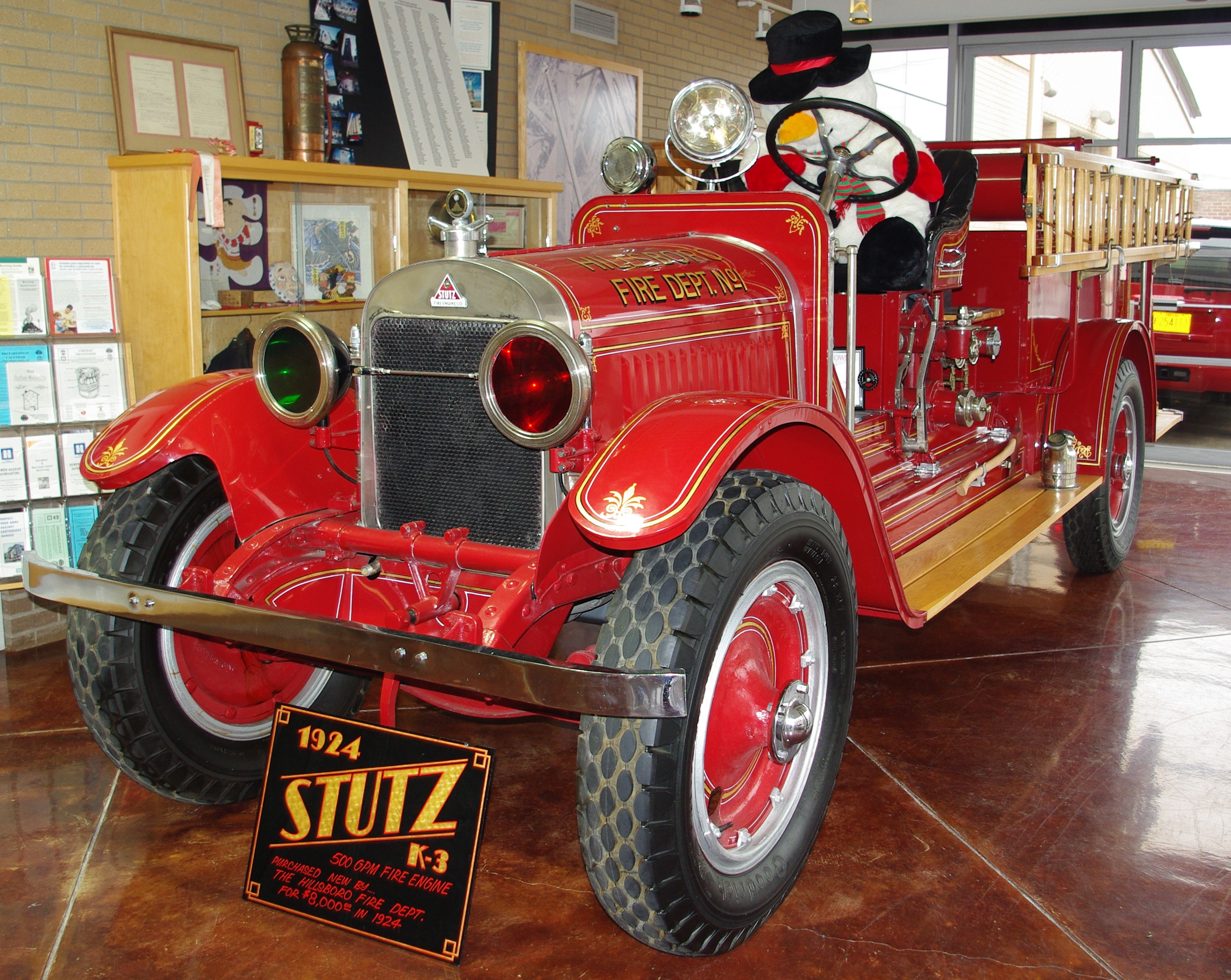
1924 Stutz fire truck at Main Station

The city purchased its first self-propelled truck in 1924 for $8,000, which is on display at the Main Station. In 1928, the department received its first chief, Walter Tews, and first paid firefighter. The Ray-Maling Cannery burned in May 1929, that required assistance from neighboring fire departments, which was followed by fire at the Commercial Building at Second and Main in January 1933 that did $75,000 in damage.

In 1947, volunteers built a new home for the department on Southeast Washington Street. Another major fire came on July 8, 1947, when the Imperial Feed & Grain Company's elevator burned along with warehouses and the Southern Pacific’s Hillsboro depot. The Hillsboro Rural Fire Protection District (now Washington County Fire District #2) is created in 1952, at which point the new district takes on fire fighting duties for the areas surrounding the city. Another, five-alarm blaze in October 1964 destroyed the new Western Farmers’ buildings at the same location. Other major fires included loss of the Venetian Theatre on September 8, 1956, followed by a three-alarm fire at Tektronix in April 1966.

By 1970 the department had grown to 12 employees and responded to a total of 540 emergencies that year. In 1974, Rescue 10 enters service as the departments first emergency medical services (EMS) vehicle. In 1976, the city approved building a temporary fire station at Bicentennial Park over the protests of neighbors, with the Parkwood Fire Station opening the next year.

Another station, known as the Brookwood Station, had been in the planning since 1978 by District 2, and had been proposed at the Drake and Brookwood site since 1981 when it was opposed by neighbors, but was built at that site. In 1985, the department started a Community Emergency Response Team to train citizens for disaster response. The department contracted with Portland Adventist Medical Center starting in 1986 for fitness evaluations that included lifestyle and dietary advice as well.

On July 1, 1987, the city and Washington County Fire District No. 2 signed a five-year agreement that transferred eight firefighters to Hillsboro while both departments would respond to calls in both territories. That agreement also led District No. 2 to abandon the Orenco fire station, with those paid firefighters moved to the Brookwood station. The move was to be temporary until the city could build a new fire station in the northeastern portion of the city. In July 1988, the city decided to return a crew to the Orenco fire station, with the engine company being transferred from the Parkwood station in central Hillsboro until the new station was built.

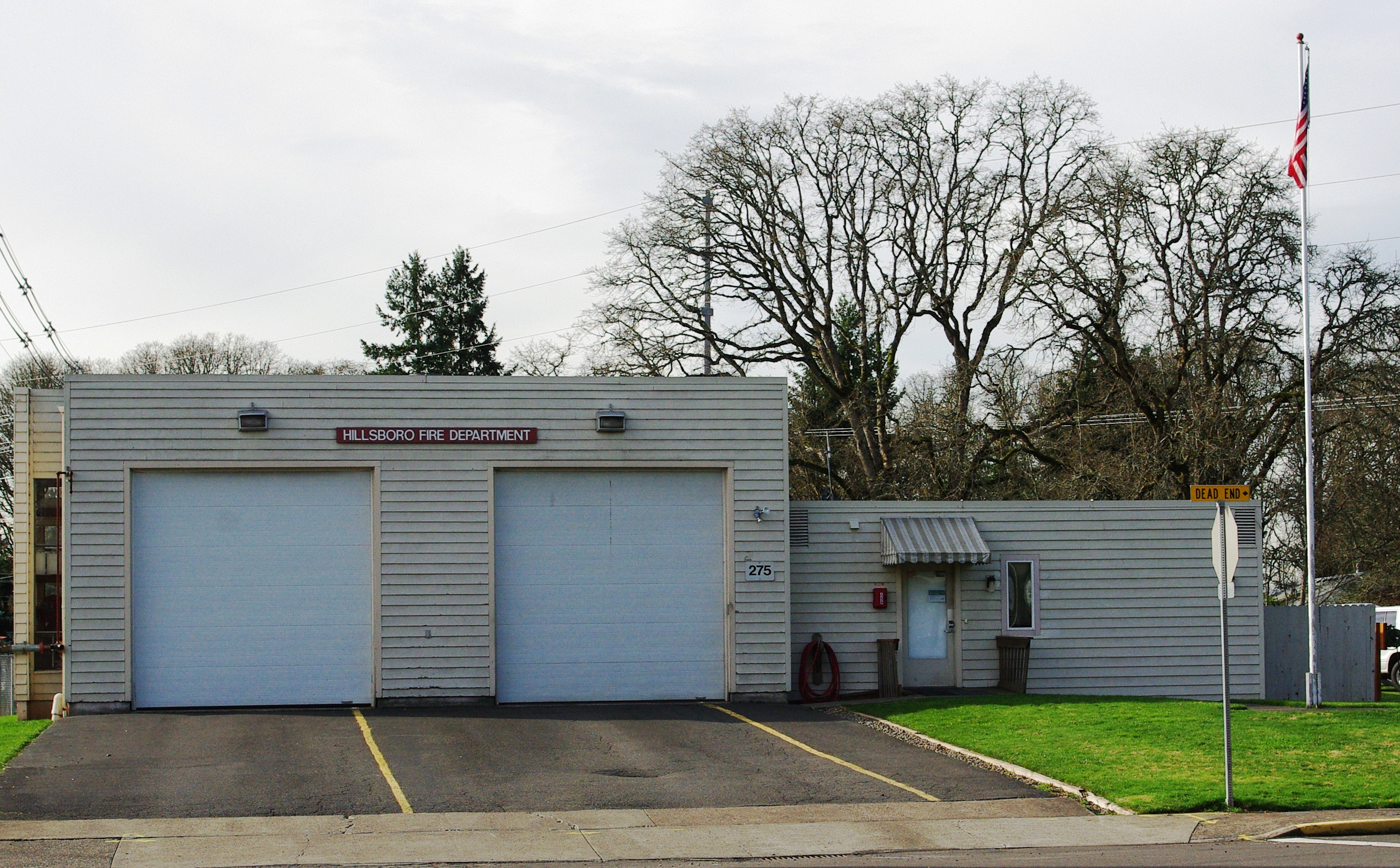
Former Parkwood Station

After Hillsboro annexed the Tanasbourne area to the east of the city in the late 1980s, the city contracted with Washington County Fire District No. 1 in January 1988 to continue providing fire protection in most of those annexed areas. Washington County Fire District No. 1 eventually merged with other fire districts and departments to become Tualatin Valley Fire and Rescue (TVF&R). Hillsboro's agreement with District No. 1 called for Hillsboro to pay the district to protect areas annexed by the city at a rate of 85% of what the district would have received had the area remained part of TVF&R, as well as TVF&R would not oppose the city's further annexations. TVF&R also maintained some of Hillsboro's fire fighting equipment. Another agreement was signed in 1987 in which the two departments would eliminate any duplication of services within the city. Brookwood Station was renovated in 1987, after it was transferred to the city, to add a sleeping area for firefighters to allow for round-the-clock operations.

Hillsboro Fire became the first department in the county to purchase a computer-controlled heart defibrillator in 1988. The department purchased two of the units, one for each substation, while the main station in downtown retained the paramedic van that included a complete defibrillation unit operated only by paramedics. Hillsboro Fire moved back to the old city hall in 1990 when city hall moved to the new Public Services Building jointly owned by Hillsboro and the county.

The city sent a battalion chief and other firefighters in August 1994 to help fight wildfires around Leavenworth, Washington, along with other firefighters from the county. Chief Dayton Arruda retired from the department in 1995, and Dennis England took over as chief. In May 1997, the department took over administrative and management functions of Washington County Rural Fire Protection District 2, as the later contracted out the role of its chief in order to save costs. District 2 is a small rural district that lies to the north and south of Hillsboro. The functions assumed by Hillsboro included fire inspections, training, maintenance, and community outreach programs.

Hillsboro Fire started using thermal imaging equipment in January 1998 after receiving a $26,000 donation to buy the unit, with the donation coming from the Hillsboro Coffee Club after the club dissolved in 1997. Also in 1998, a new 14,531-square-foot (1,350.0 m^{2}) fire station opened on Northwest 229th Avenue near the new Hillsboro Stadium. Designed by Group MacKenzie, the $2.7 million Ronler Acres Fire Station also contains a community meeting area and some city offices.

=== Twenty-first century ===
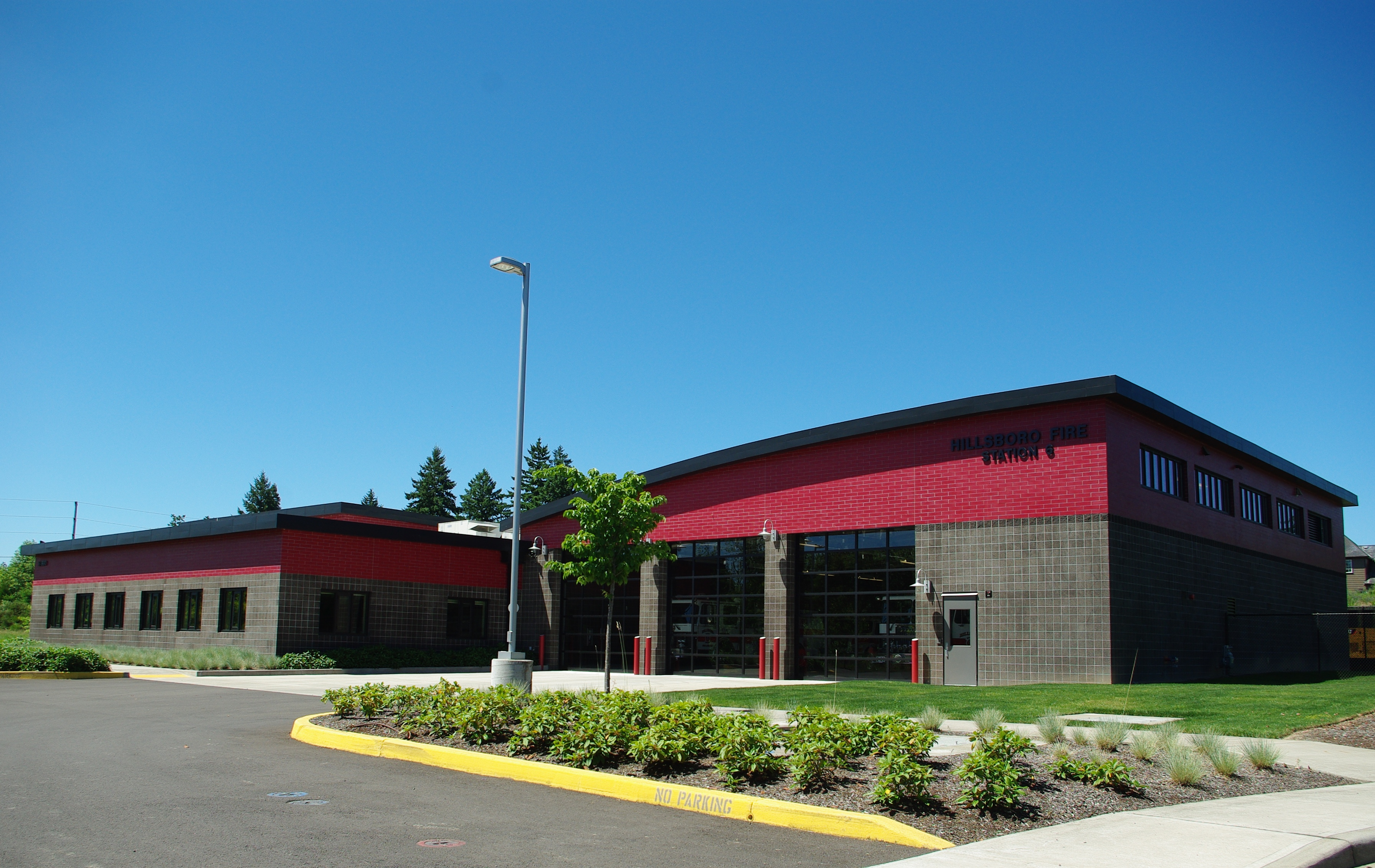
Cherry Lane Fire Station

Dennis England retired as chief of the department in October 2002 after seven years in the position and 32 years with the department. By 2002, Hillsboro Fire grew to 91 employees and responded to 486 calls each month. On January 26, 2004, Gary Seidel started as Hillsboro's new chief of the fire department, which had grown to 75 firefighters with an additional 25 volunteers. He had been with the Los Angeles Fire Department where he was an assistant fire chief.

A MAX Light Rail train collided with one of the department's fire engines in January 2005, injuring four people. The department was involved in possible merger discussions or coordination in training and purchasing in 2005 with all of the fire districts in the western part of the county. However, none of the departments merged. The department added a fuel cell to the Ronler Acres Fire Station in 2006, the first fire department in the Northwest to use one. The fuel cell, built by ClearEdge Power, was a demonstration project funded by federal programs and local utilities and was to serve as back-up power for the station.

In late 2009, the city started construction on the $2.8 million Cherry Lane fire station near Cornelius Pass Road. The 16,000-foot (4,900 m) station opened in August 2010, officially known as Fire Station No. 6, which was paid for by a local option tax levy and the city's general fund. Designed to be environmentally friendly, it included solar panels and other features that earned it a Gold rating from the Leadership in Energy and Environmental Design standards. In January 2010, the department achieved five-year accreditation by the Commission on Fire Accreditation International. The temporary Parkwood station was replaced in 2012 by the new Jones Farm Fire Station adjacent to the Hillsboro Airport. The department, in conjunction with the Police Department, announced a joint training facility would be built near Hillsboro Stadium. Washington County Fire District 2 ended its contract with the city in 2015.

== Apparatus and stations ==
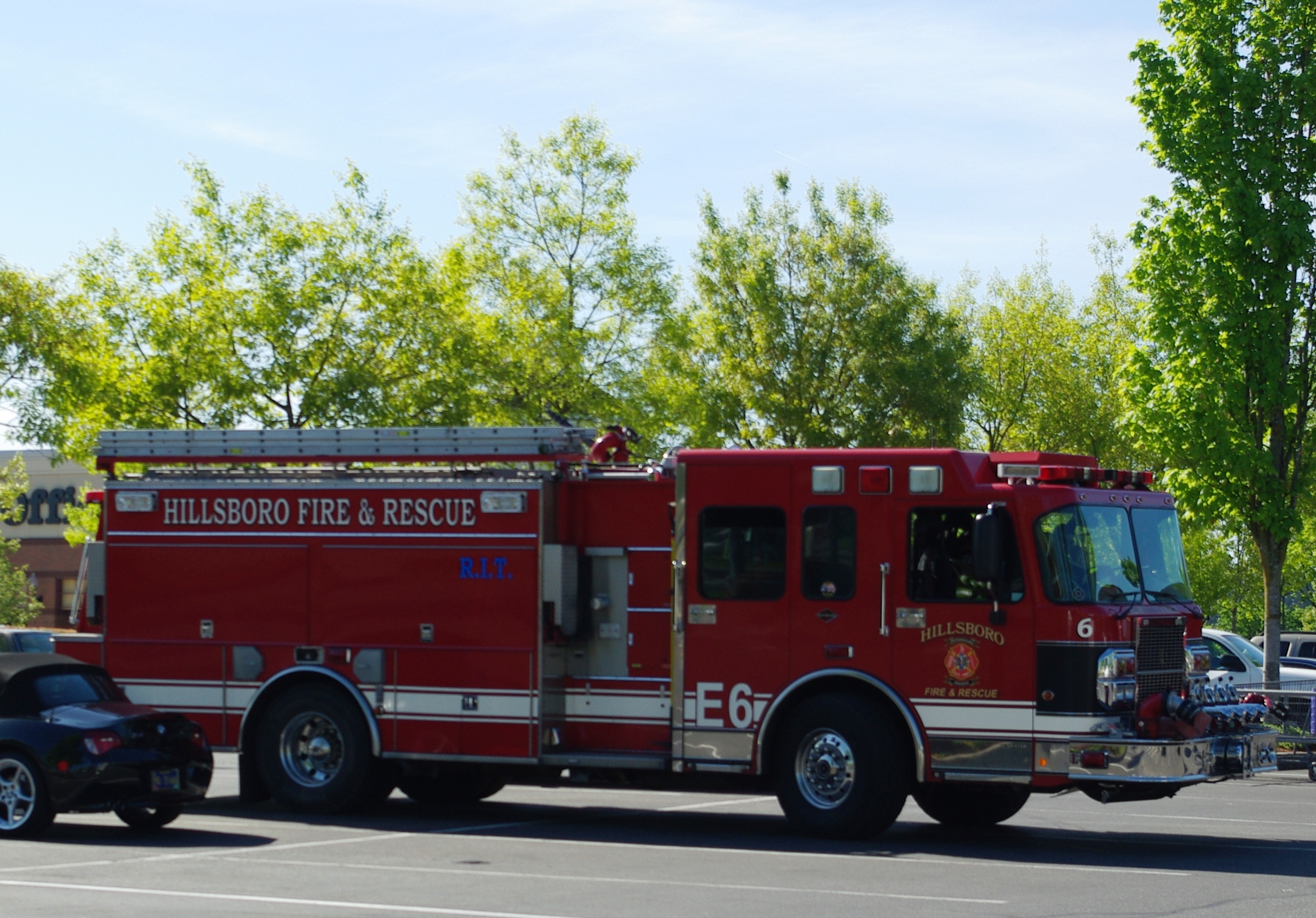
Engine No. 6

The department operates five stations around the city. The newest is the Jones Farm Station (No. 5) on Northeast 25th Avenue next to the airport that opened in 2012. Ronler Acres (No. 3) near Cornelius Pass Road and Evergreen Parkway opened in 1998. Cherry Lane Station (No. 6), which includes the department's training facility and volunteer operations, opened in 2010 in the Orenco area. Brookwood Station (No. 2) opened about 1982 along Brookwood Avenue in southeast Hillsboro near Tualatin Valley Highway. Main Station (No. 1) in downtown Hillsboro on First Street opened in 1997 and includes the administrative offices of the department. Both the Jones Farm and Cherry Lane stations are LEED Gold certified buildings, with both structures being of a similar design.

Hillsboro Fire & Rescue operates five engines, one at each station, a ladder truck, located at Jones Farm, and three reserve engines. They also have a single tender, two brush rigs, two EMS units, a technical rescue vehicle, and a command vehicle. For the fiscal year ending in 2013 the department responded to 9,219 calls, which included 276 fires, 533 motor vehicle accidents, and 4,597 medical responses.

Fire Station Number	Address	Engine company	Truck company	Wildland units	Other units
1	240 S First Ave	Engine 1		Water Tender 1	
2	5045 SE Drake Rd	Engine 2		Brush 2	
3	4455 NW 229th St	Engine 3		Brush 3	Technical Rescue 3
5	2850 NE 25th Ave	Engine 5	Truck 5		Command 1
6	1225 NE Cherry Ln	Engine 6			

== Organization ==
The department is headed by a fire chief and has two deputy chiefs and a total of 123 employees. There are four battalion chiefs in the department, which has an $18 million annual budget as of 2013. In addition to firefighting and medical responses, the department has special operations units for handling hazardous materials, confined space rescues, high- and low-angle rope rescues, vehicle and machinery extractions, water rescues, and structural collapses. For water rescues, Hillsboro Fire & Rescue has a small powerboat.

== See also ==
- Firefighting in Oregon
