= Portland Fire Station No. 17 =

Historic building in Portland, Oregon, U.S.

- U.S. National Register of Historic Places
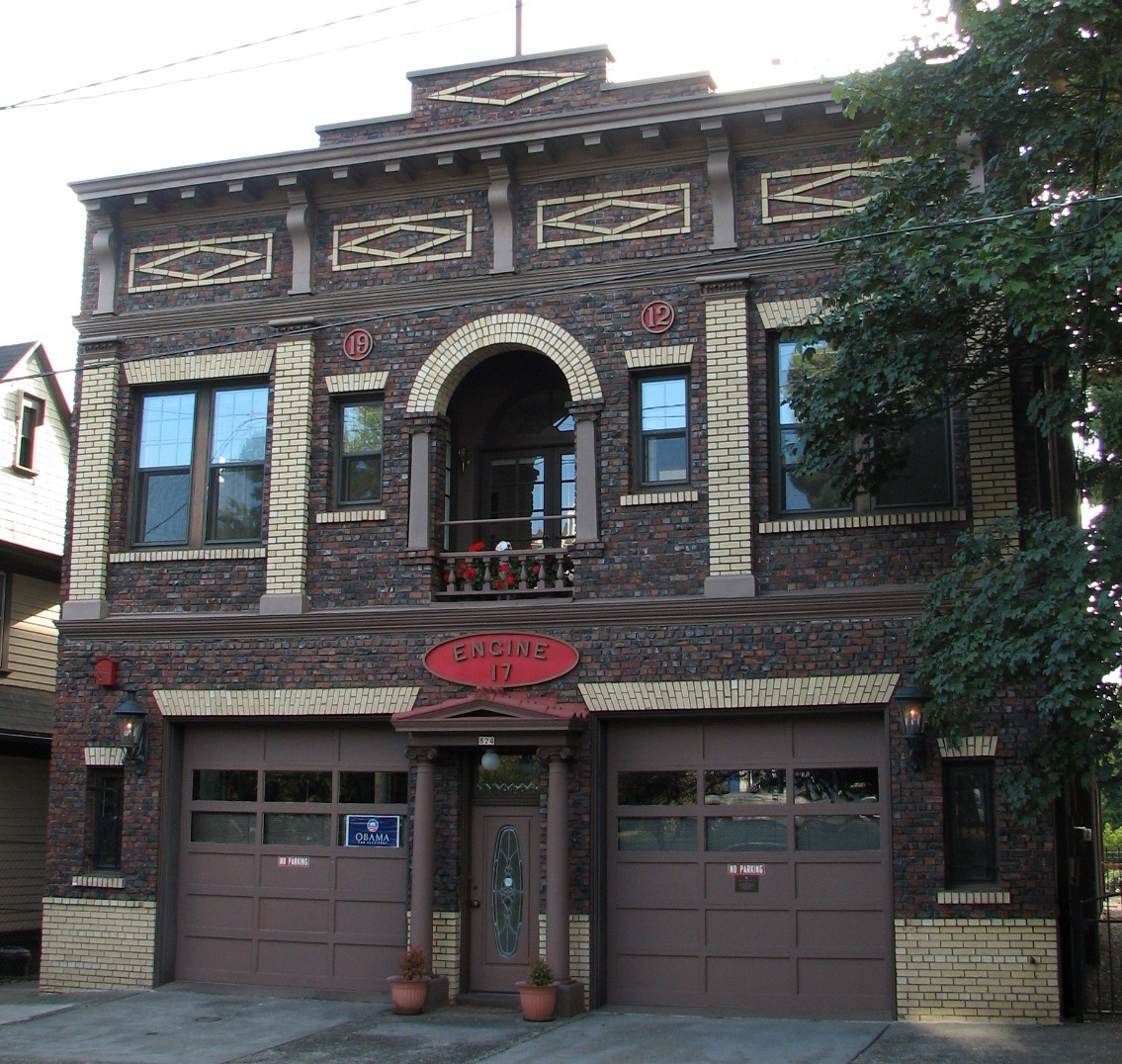

- Location within Oregon
- Location: 824 N.W. Twenty-fourth Ave., Portland, Oregon
- Coordinates: 45°31′44″N 122°42′01″W
- Area: less than one acre
- Built: 1912
- Architect: Lee Gray Holden, E.L. Siner
- Architectural style: Georgian
- NRHP reference No.: 87000311
- Added to NRHP: March 12, 1987

Portland Fire Station No. 17, at 824 N.W. Twenty-fourth Ave. in Portland, Oregon, was built in 1912. It was listed on the National Register of Historic Places in 1987.

It originally held a horse-drawn steam pumper and a horse-drawn ladder truck, requiring three and two horses respectively.

It was designed by Lee Gray Holden, who was serving as Battalion Chief during 1911–1922, as part of his career in Portland Fire Bureau.

== History ==
In 1968 or 1969, the station ceased to function as a firehouse, and was used for storage by Portland Fire & Rescue. 1n 1984, the city sold the building to a private owner, who converted it to a private residence.

In 2011, it was sold to Karla Pearlstein, an expert in restoring historic homes. In 2019 the project team who worked on the restoration received a DeMuro Award for an outstanding restoration by the statewide preservation organization Restore Oregon.

In 2022 the building was featured in an episode of the documentary series "Where We Call Home."

== See also ==
- Firefighting in Oregon
