= Grants Pass City Hall and Fire Station =

- U.S. National Register of Historic Places
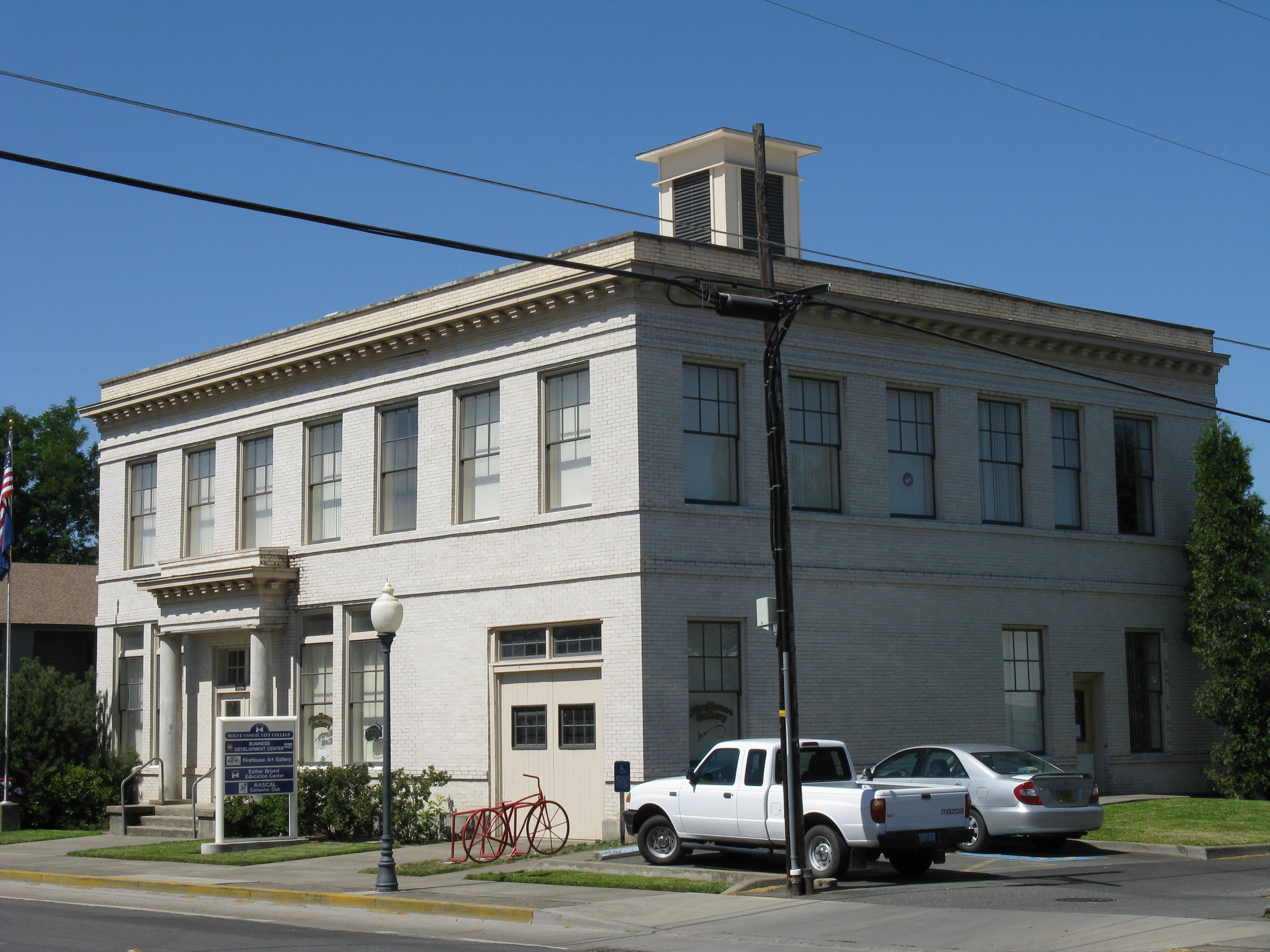

- Location within Oregon
- Location: 4th and H Sts., Grants Pass, Oregon
- Coordinates: 42°26′21″N 123°19′48″W
- Area: 0.1 acres (0.040 ha)
- Built: 1912
- Built by: M.J. Clark
- Architect: W.F. Bowen
- Architectural style: American Renaissance
- NRHP reference No.: 84003017
- Added to NRHP: September 7, 1984

The Grants Pass City Hall and Fire Station, at 4th and H Streets in Grants Pass, Oregon, was built in 1912. It was listed on the National Register of Historic Places in 1984.

It is a two-story brick building designed by Ashland architect W.F. Bowen.

It is 50 by 60 feet (15 m × 18 m) in plan. It was built to house the city hall, a jail and a fire station. A fire hose drying tower was included.

== See also ==
- Firefighting in Oregon
