= Ascension (Calvo) =

Sculpture by Robert Calvo in Portland, Oregon, U.S.

- The installation in 2017
- Artist: Robert Calvo
- Year: 1996
- Type: Sculpture
- Medium: Steel; brick; glass; reinforced gypsum
- Subject: Ladders
- Location: Portland, Oregon, United States; 45°31′19″N 122°40′16″W
- Owner: City of Portland and Multnomah County Public Art Collection courtesy of the Regional Arts & Culture Council

Ascension is an outdoor 1996 sculpture by American artist Robert Calvo, located in downtown Portland, Oregon. It is part of the City of Portland and Multnomah County Public Art Collection courtesy of the Regional Arts & Culture Council.

== Description and history ==
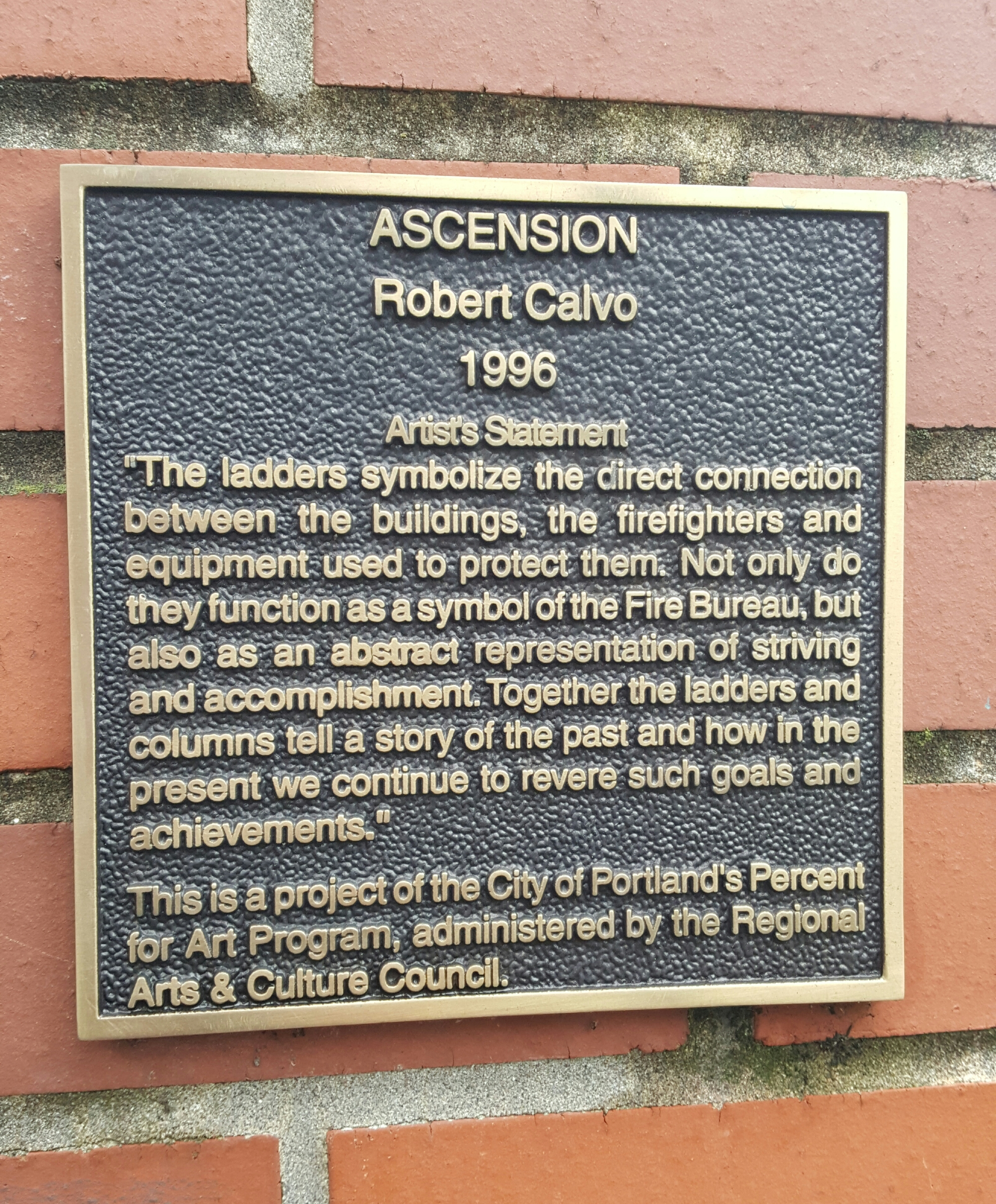
Plaque for the sculpture

Ascension was completed by Robert Calvo in 1996. It is made of steel, brick, glass, and reinforced gypsum, and is installed at Fire Station 01 (55 SW Ash Street) at Southwest 1st Avenue between Southwest Ash and Pine Streets. According to the Regional Arts & Culture Council, which administers the sculpture, "The ladders symbolize the direct connection between the buildings, the firefighters and equipment used to protect them. Not only do they function as a symbol of the fire bureau, but also as an abstract representation of striving and accomplishment. Together the ladders and columns tell a story of the past and how the present we continue to revere such goals and achievements."

The work was funded by the city's Percent for Art program and is part of the City of Portland and Multnomah County Public Art Collection courtesy of the Regional Arts & Culture Council.

== See also ==
- 1996 in art
- Firefighting in Oregon
