= Mid-Columbia Fire and Rescue =

Emergency services provider in Oregon

Operational area
- Country: United States
- State: Oregon
- City: The Dalles
- Address: 1400 W 8th St, The Dalles, OR 97058
- Coordinates: 45.6073° N, 121.2051° W

Agency overview
- Employees: 27 (Career - 2014)
- Annual budget: $5,082,140 (2014)
- Staffing: Combination
- Fire chief: Robert Palmer
- IAFF: local 1308

Facilities and equipment
- Divisions: 3
- Battalions: 0
- Stations: 2
- Engines: 4
- Trucks: 1
- Tillers: 0
- Platforms: 0
- Quints: 0
- Squads: 0
- Rescues: 0
- Ambulances: 6
- Tenders: 2
- HAZMAT: 0
- USAR: 0
- Airport crash: 0
- Wildland: 6
- Bulldozers: 0
- Airplanes: 0
- Helicopters: 0
- Fireboats: 0
- Rescue boats: 0
- Light and air: 0

Website
- www.mcfr.org

Mid-Columbia Fire and Rescue is the fire protection, emergency medical services, hazmat, search and rescue, and extrication provider for The Dalles and northern Wasco County in the state of Oregon. The department is made up of both paid staff and volunteers. They protect about 16,000 people that cover an area of about 120 sq mi (310.8 km^{2}). Formed in 1995, the department has two fire stations and serve a primarily residential area. They have an ISO rating of 4–8.

== History ==
The fire department in The Dalles was built upon by several hose, and hook and ladder companies throughout the latter half of the 19th century. The first hook and ladder to serve The Dalles was Hook and Ladder Company No. 1 which formed May 3, 1859 and later disbanded January 6, 1860. That same year, on October 28, the city commissioned and completed work on an engine house.

The Diligent Hook and Ladder Company was formed January 15, 1862; this company later tendered resignation to the city council—which accepted the resignation—and was disbanded January 15, 1863. At this same time a petition was filed to organize the Jackson Engine Company No. 1. In 1880 a new steam fire engine—purchased by the city—was given to them.

A few years later, on June 19, 1865, the Grant Hook and Ladder Company was organized and given the truck and other equipment of the former Diligent Hook and Ladder Company. On September 28, 1865, Relief Hose Company No. 1 was formed; this company later disbanded in 1868.

There was a new hose company to be known as the Columbia Hose Company was organized May 8, 1875. Later, on September 8, 1879 the Wasco Engine Company No. 2 was formed, but later disbanded in April 1882.

By 1905, The Dalles was thought to have "had one of the best volunteer fire departments and apparatus of any town in the state." Their apparatus consisted of "a steam engine, chemical engine, hand engine, five hose companies and one hook and ladder company, all thoroughly equipped with the latest improved appliances for fighting."

The department, as currently operating, was formed by a vote of the people which consolidated the City of The Dalles Fire Department with the Wasco Rural Fire Protection District effective July 1, 1995. The name Wasco Rural Fire Protection district was kept until May 16, 1996 when it was changed to the current name.

== Board of directors ==
Mid-Columbia Fire and Rescue is governed by a Board of Directors, elected at-large by registered voters within the district. Board members serve a three-year term in office. Board meetings are generally held on the third Monday of each month at the district main fire station located at 1400 W. 8th Street in The Dalles Oregon. Occasionally, the Board Meeting date or location will change and the change will be publicly announced. Board meetings are open to the public. Here are your current board members.

Position#1: Diana Bailey- Director Bailey is very active within the community. She was previously involved as a volunteer in Fire/Emergency Medical Services with MCFR starting in 1992 where she discovered her ability and joy in serving others. She also has previous experience as an MCFR Board member from July 1999 to January 2011 and served on the Fire District Budget Committee as well until becoming a board member in 2019.

A longtime resident of The Dalles, Director Bailey spends time working in her garden, reading, time with family, and walking dogs Chukar, Dusky, and Brant on the River Front Trail. In 2002, Director Bailey pursued a nursing career that has spanned frontline care in medical-surgical, family birth, and critical care to that of a nurse educator at Columbia Gorge Community College. Director Bailey later joined Mid-Columbia Center for Living (MCCFL) in the spring of 2016 as Nurse Care Supervisor to assist in the design and implementation of an integrated care model which emphasizes recovery, wellness, trauma-informed care, and physical-behavioral health.

Diana's previous occupations include time as an Orchardist, employment with Fish and Game, and working in Forestry. Director Bailey has also been involved with other Boards and committees such as Home at Last, and Habitat for Humanity. Her background and experience in both public and private service makes Diana an excellent representative of our Fire District Board.

Position#2 Bob Delaney- Bob has lived in The Dalles with his wife Patty and their daughter since 1983. Director Delaney is a retired business manager from Northwest Payroll. He was also employed by Wheeler's Communications and was the Executive Director for Wasco county 911 for a period of three years. Director Delaney is a past director and Board President for the Northern Wasco County Parks and Recreation District, Past President of The Dalles Lions Club and a 25-year veteran with The Dalles Fire Department and Mid-Columbia Fire and Rescue retiring as a Volunteer Captain in 2011. Director Delaney brings a vast array of knowledge and experience to the MCFR Board of Directors.

Position#3 David Peters- Peters and his wife Theresa moved to The Dalles in 1989. Their three children grew up and attended school here in The Dalles and have now moved on to higher education. Director Peters has a BS degree from Oregon State in Business Administration and brings over 10-years of experience working at a local non-profit. Director Peter's wife is currently the Principal of Dry Hollow School. Director Peters has spent numerous hours volunteering as a coach for youth sports and with various organizations throughout the community. Director Peter's level of education and experience makes him an asset to the Fire District Board of Directors.

Position#4 David Jacobs- Jacobs is a retired Unit Forester from the Oregon Department of Forestry (ODF) with 31 years of service with ODF and 4 years of service with Hood River County Forestry. He has a total of 35 years of wildland and all hazard risk experience. Director Jacobs was also member of the Wasco Rural Fire District's budget committee from 1988 to 1995, and a Mid-Columbia Fire and Rescue's (MCFR) budget committee member from 1996 to 2017 at which time he was elected to the MCFR board. Director Jacobs additionally has 12 years of experience sitting on the St. Mary's Academy School Board and Finance Committee. Director Jacob's extensive background and experience in both public and private service make him an excellent fit for the MCFR Board of Directors.

Position#5 Dick Schaffeld- Dick has lived in The Dalles with his wife Sandy and their two sons since 1991. He and his son Wayne work together in Bandit Glass, a mobile windshield repair and replacement service. Director Schaffeld is an avid animal lover and his dog “Cash” goes everywhere he goes. Director Schaffeld lives on a small farm located in The Dalles and is supportive of 4-H, FFA, youth events and activities within Wasco, and Sherman Counties and the surrounding area. Director Schaffeld brings his vast array of community involvement, knowledge and business experience to the Fire District Board.

== Emergency medical service ==
The ambulance service serves an area of over 200 sq mi (518 km^{2}).

== Volunteers ==
The department has about 40 volunteers that perform both firefighter and EMS duties. The volunteers also have a chaplain and support services. Volunteer recruits attend a fire academy put on yearly by the Columbia Gorge Training Association.

== See also ==
- Firefighting in Oregon
