= Portland Fire Station No. 23 =

Historic building in Portland, Oregon, U.S.

- U.S. National Register of Historic Places
- Portland Historic Landmark
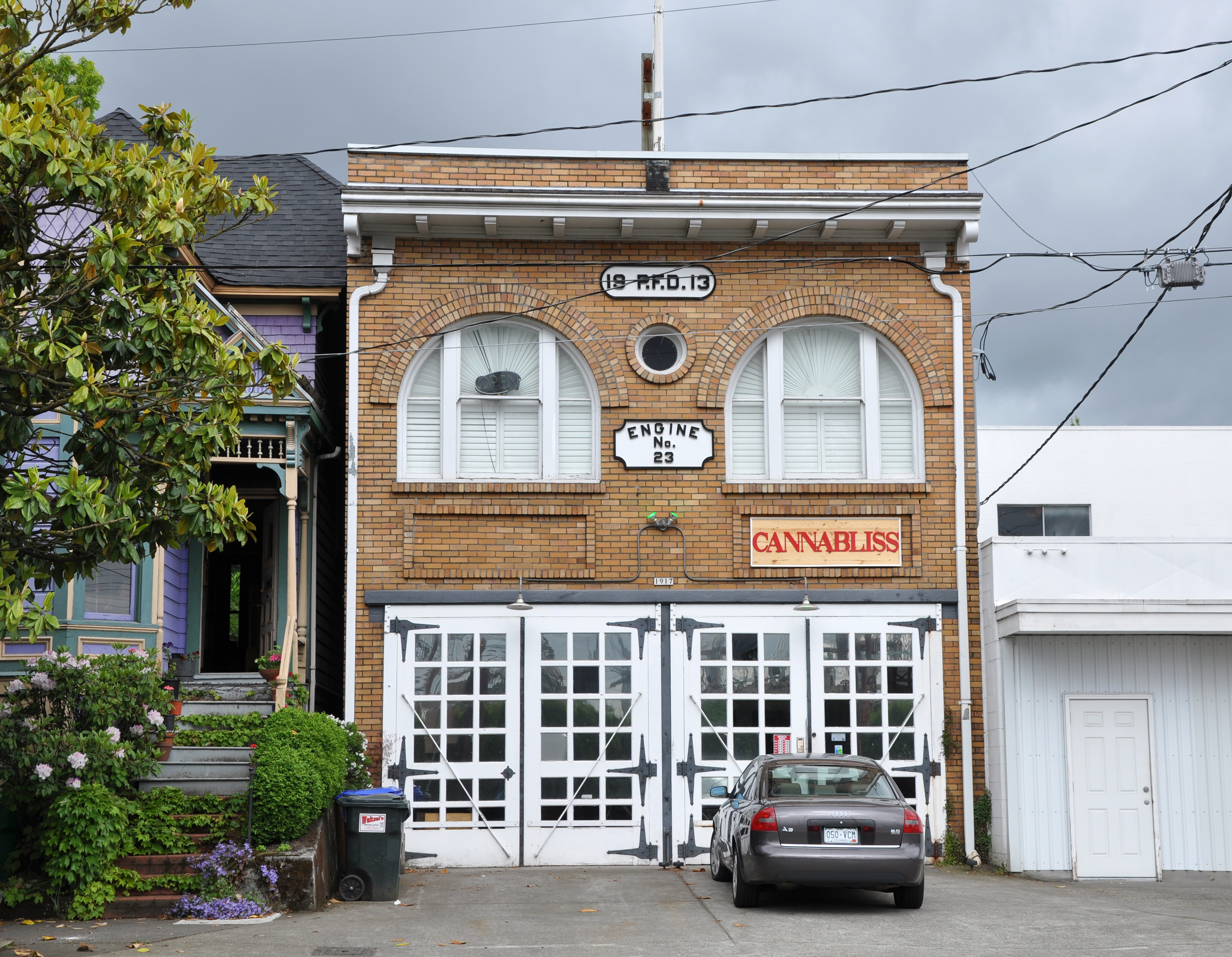
- Portland Fire Station No. 23 in 2011
- Location: 1917 SE 7th Avenue; Portland, Oregon
- Coordinates: 45°30′33″N 122°39′33″W
- Built: 1913
- Architectural style: Italianate
- MPS: Portland Eastside
- NRHP reference No.: 89000108
- Added to NRHP: May 8, 1989

Historic Portland Fire Station No. 23 is a two-story former fire station building listed on the National Register of Historic Places, in southeast Portland in the U.S. state of Oregon. Built in Italianate style in 1913, it was added to the register in 1989.

Fire Station No. 23 occupies a narrow lot in a block that was known as "Firehouse Row". The lot was the site of one of East Portland's earliest firehouses, home to Grant Engine Company No. 2 (later Hose Company No. 3) as early as 1884. In 1913, Fire Station No. 23 replaced the earlier building. In September 2023 a different building, also on Firehouse Row, was brought into operation under the name Fire Station 23. The rest of the block, dating to the late 19th century, consisted of houses built for firefighters and their families.

The rectangular fire station, typical of many Portland Fire Bureau buildings constructed on the east side in the early 20th century, has masonry walls and a flat roof with a full parapet. Exterior features include a facade of buff-colored brick, four wooden doors, arch windows topped by brick voussoirs, a bullseye window, and the original fire station signs. The first floor of the interior originally included the engine room, two offices, a hallway, and a half-bath (toilet and sink). The second floor consisted of a large room in front, with two smaller offices, a kitchen, bathroom, and hallway in back.

Lee Gray Holden (1865–1943) was for many years associated with Fire Station No. 23 and its predecessor building. Although it is not known if he designed this particular building, he is credited with designing 24 Portland firehouses and fire boats. A native of Illinois, he moved to Oregon in 1885 and joined Grant Engine Company No. 2, a volunteer company, in 1887, before East Portland became part of Portland. In 1891, he became the first paid firefighter on the east side. Despite being fired for political reasons by Mayor Sylvester Pennoyer in 1896, he was re-hired as fire battalion chief of the east side in 1898, after Pennoyer left office. Retiring to the mountain community of Zigzag to design and build a hotel in 1908, he returned to Portland in 1911 to become battalion chief of the city's southeast fire district. In that post, he was stationed at Fire Station No. 23 from 1913 to 1923. In 1923, Holden became Portland's assistant fire chief and, three months later, fire chief, a position he held until his retirement in 1927.

== See also ==
- Firefighting in Oregon
- National Register of Historic Places listings in Southeast Portland, Oregon
- Portland Fire Station No. 7 – another former firehouse listed on the National Register
