= Firefighting in Oregon =

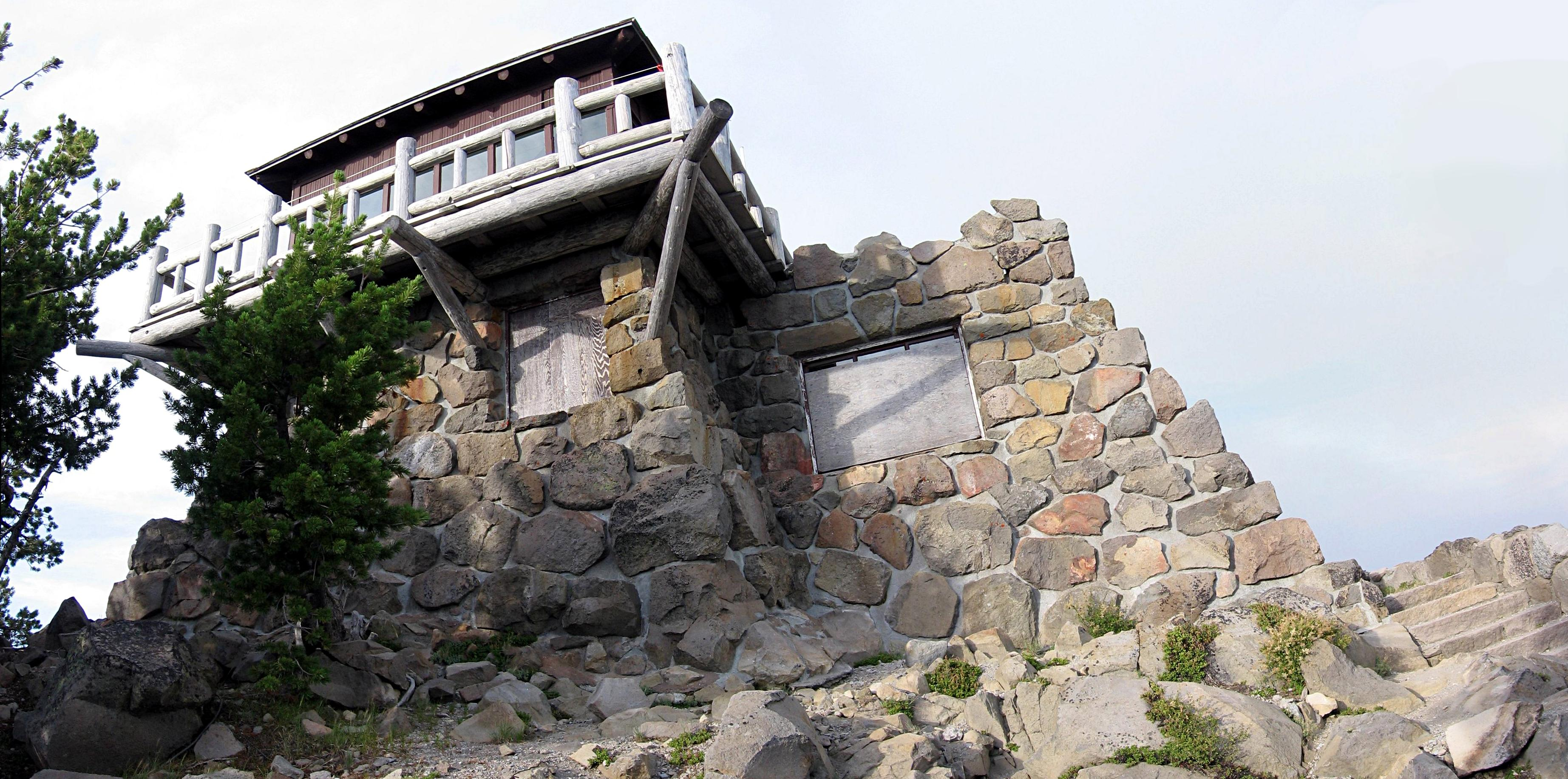
Watchman Lookout Station

The U.S. state of Oregon has an extensive history of firefighting.

== Departments and stations ==
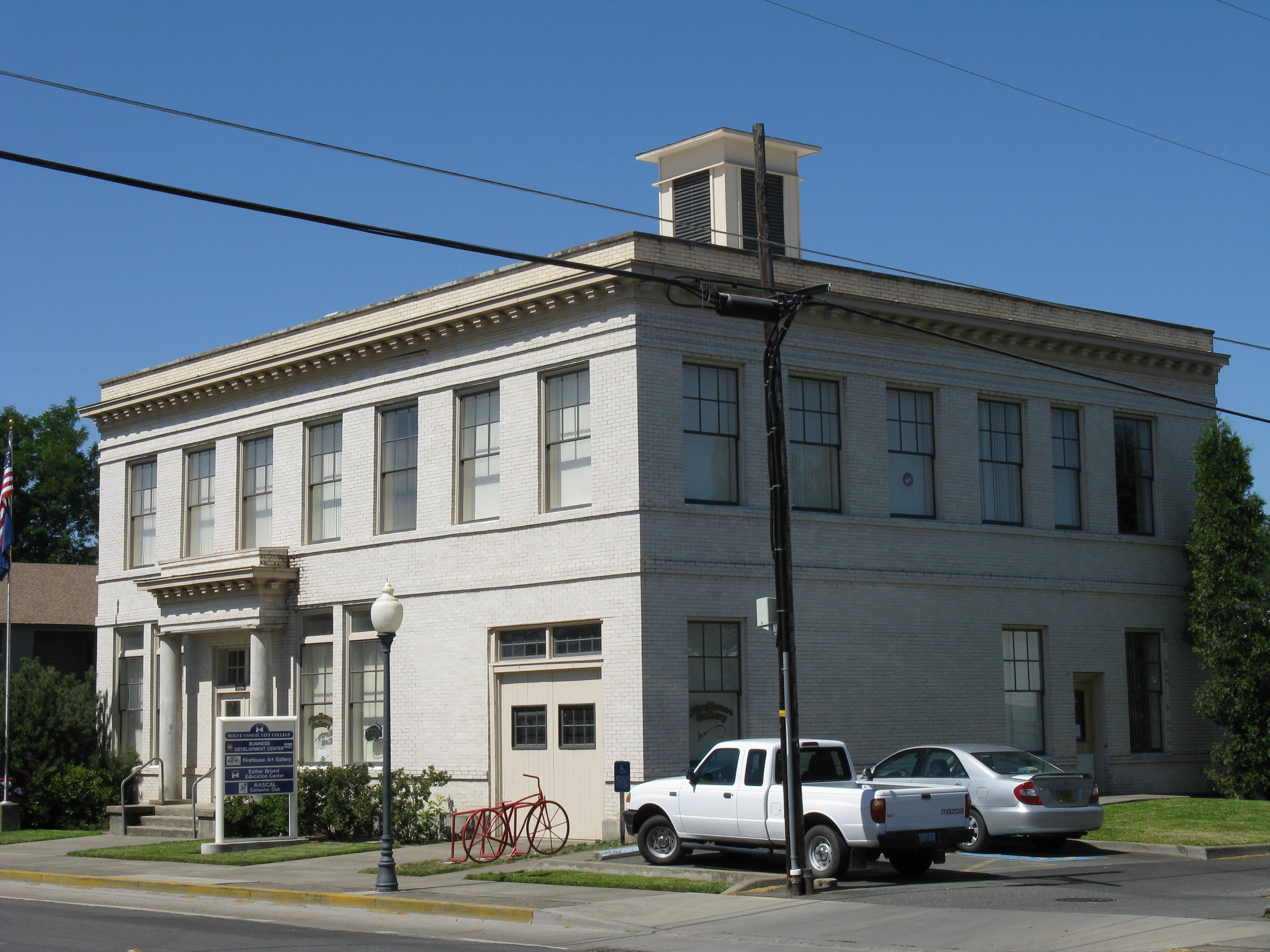
Grants Pass City Hall and Fire Station

Fire departments include Forest Grove Fire and Rescue, Hillsboro Fire Department, Mid-Columbia Fire and Rescue, Portland Fire & Rescue, Tualatin Valley Fire and Rescue, Washington County Fire District 2, and Clackamas Fire.

Notable stations include the Grants Pass City Hall and Fire Station, Portland Fire Station No. 7, and Portland Fire Station No. 17. Defunct stations include Astoria Fire House No. 2, the Interstate Firehouse Cultural Center, Portland Fire Station No. 23, and the Woodstock Community Center.

== Fireboats ==
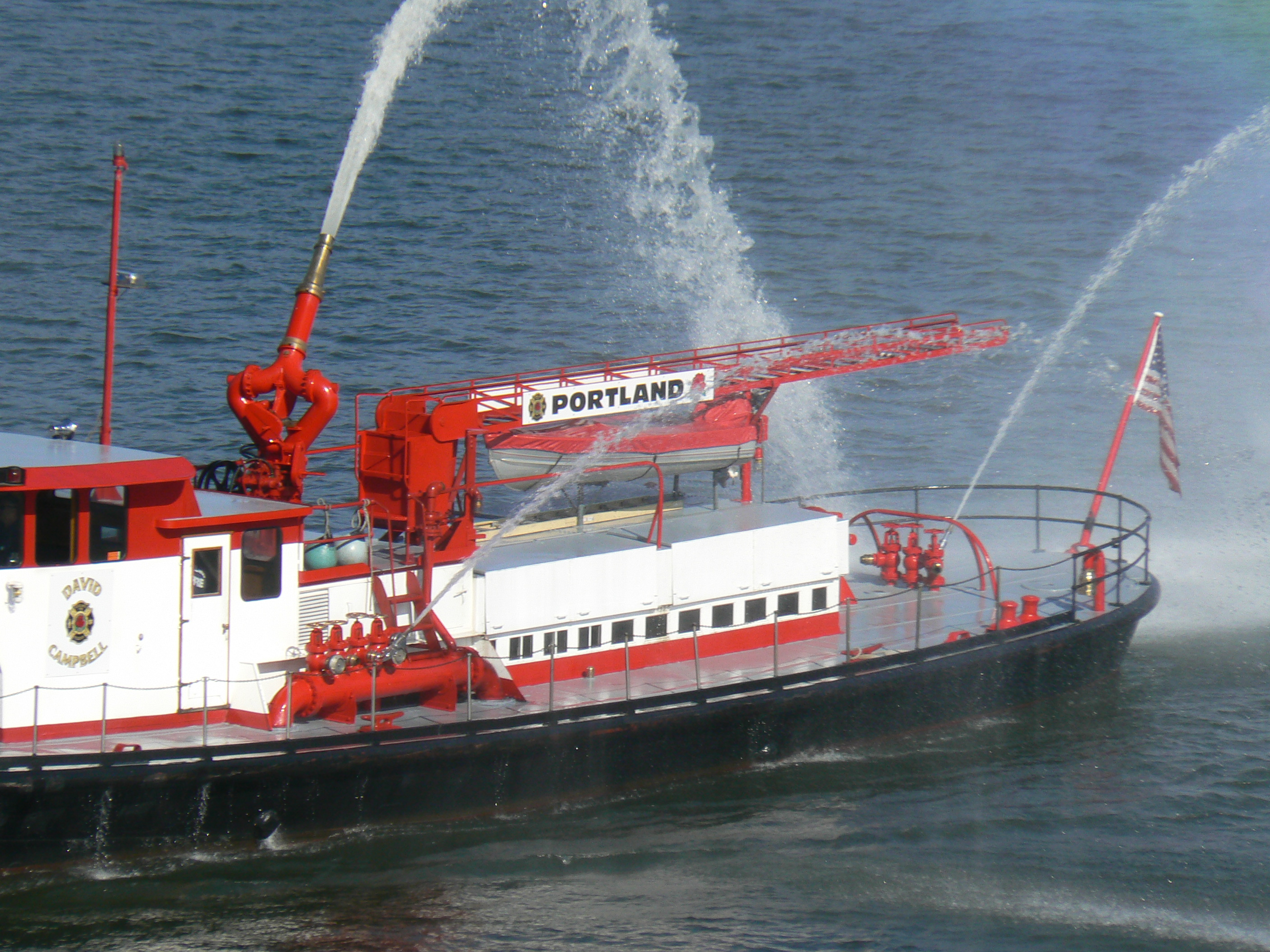
David Campbell (1927)

Notable fireboats include the David Campbell (1912), the David Campbell (1927), the Eldon Trinity, and the Karl Prehn.

== Lookout towers ==
Notable lookout towers include the Waldo Mountain Fire Lookout and the Watchman Lookout Station.

== Memorials and public art ==
The public artwork Ascension and the David Campbell Memorial are installed in Portland.
