= Portland Fire Station No. 7 =

Historic building in Portland, Oregon, U.S.

- U.S. National Register of Historic Places
- Portland Historic Landmark
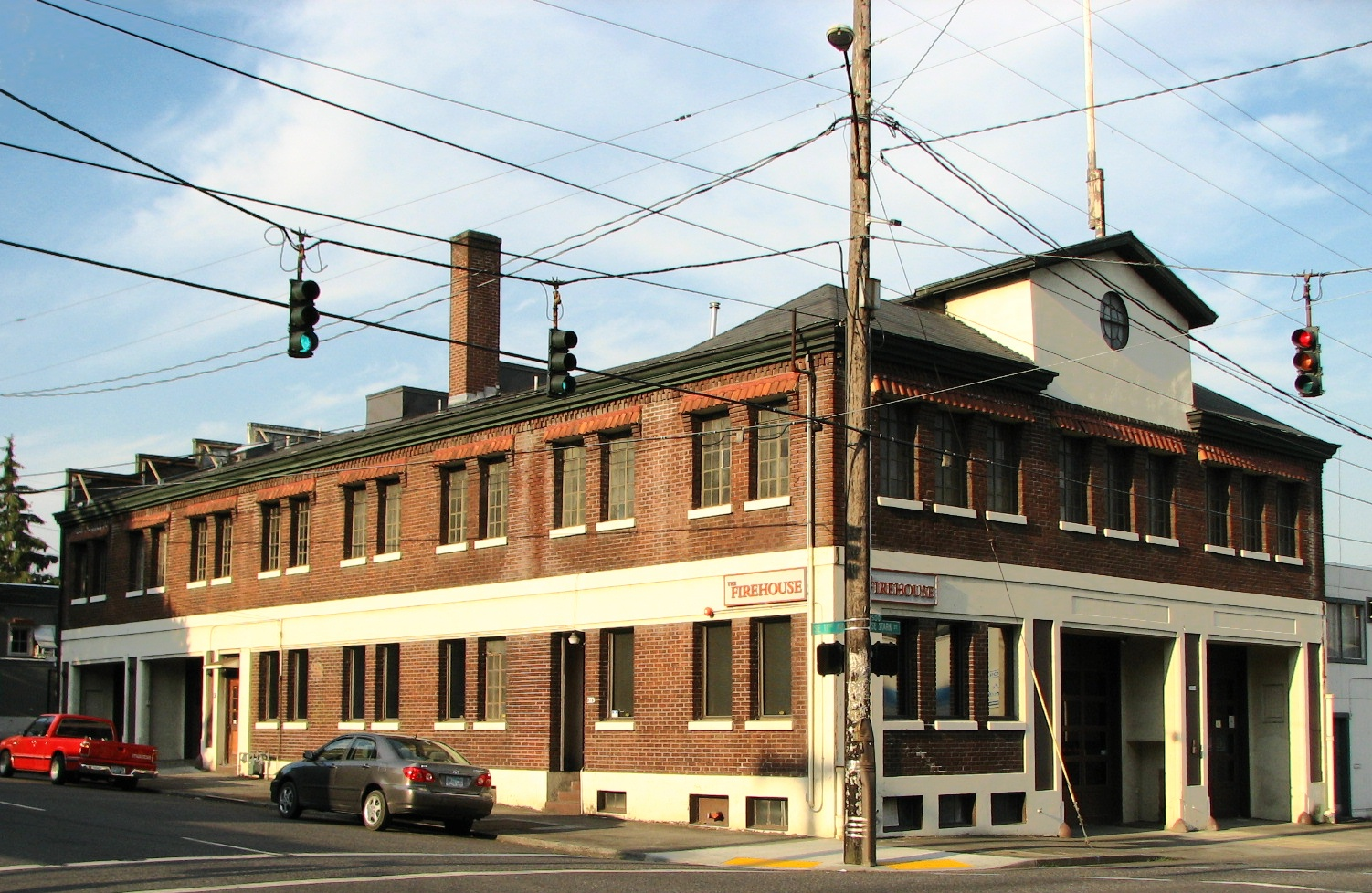
- Fire Station No. 7 building in 2008, before its restoration
- Location: 1036 SE Stark Street; Portland, Oregon
- Coordinates: 45°31′09″N 122°39′18″W
- Area: 50 by 100 feet (15 by 30 m)
- Built: 1927
- Architect: Lee Gray Holden
- Architectural style: Commercial
- MPS: Portland Eastside
- NRHP reference No.: 89000109
- Added to NRHP: June 8, 1989

Portland Fire Station No. 7, located in southeast Portland in the U.S. state of Oregon, is a two-story structure listed on the National Register of Historic Places. Built in 1927, it was added to the register in 1989. It was the last of numerous Portland firehouses to be designed by fire chief and architect Lee Gray Holden, who died of a stroke while visiting the No. 7 firehouse in 1943. The building continued to be used by the city's Fire Department until the 1980s, when it was sold off and used as an automobile garage. It was acquired by a local developer in 2009, and was restored and remodeled for office and retail use.

== Architecture ==
=== Exterior ===
The building is located at 1036 SE Stark Street in the Buckman neighborhood of southeast Portland. It comprises two main elements—the original 1927 masonry firehouse, and an adjacent wood-faced garage constructed to the east in 1964. The firehouse and garage together have a footprint of approximately 100 feet (30 m) by 110 feet (34 m), of which the masonry building contributes roughly 50 by 100 feet (15 by 30 m).

The exterior features of the masonry firehouse include a gable roof, a central gable dormer with a multi-pane oval window, skylights, and a red brick chimney. The firehouse, which has a full basement, rests on a concrete foundation. Two bays with garage doors and one bay with windows dominate the north face of the ground floor. Three second-floor bays match the first-floor bays, except that all have windows instead of doors. Two more doors open into the firehouse at the south end of the east façade. Many of the windows on both floors are paired.

The 1.5-story addition east of the firehouse originally housed a mechanic's garage, but the addition is not included in the historic registry listing.

=== Interior ===
The original structure was divided into office, dormitory, and vehicle areas. The first floor was used mainly for parking and servicing fire trucks and other vehicles, but included space for a handball court with an electronic scoreboard. Fire department staff lived on the second floor, with some personnel—presumably the chief and other senior staff—maintaining their own separate quarters.

== History ==
Fire Station No. 7 is associated with Lee Gray Holden (1865–1943), a nationally renowned designer of firehouses. Built in 1927, the station was intended to serve as a state-of-the-art facility to house the fire department's headquarters on Portland's East Side. It originally housed the headquarters' administrative and service functions, and was used as the service center for East Side fire vehicles. The building was the largest and last of the 24 firehouses designed by Holden, who served as battalion chief for the southeast sector of the city. It followed a semi-standardised layout that he had devised for his firehouses, with dormitories above the first-floor working space. Eleven of his firehouses still stand, of which No. 7 is the largest. In 1943, Holden died of a stroke while visiting the building.

The fire department continued to use the building for many years after Holden's death. It was expanded in the 1970s, and was used as a repair center and garage for the entire department until it was sold off in the 1980s. It was subsequently used as an automotive garage, before being abandoned in the late 2000s. Much of the interior is still intact; surviving features include the original partitioning walls and booths resembling telephone boxes which enclose the firemen's poles. The scoreboard and other fixtures of the handball court are also still in place.

In 2009, Portland developer Venerable Properties and partners acquired the property with a plan to renovate it and turn it into modern offices and retail space. The project incorporated both the original masonry building and the 1960s garage next door. The work, which took place between August 2009 and March 2010 at a cost of $3.8 million, restored the masonry building's exterior appearance to its historical condition and preserved the surviving interior fittings. The non-historical south-facing roll-up garage doors have been replaced with historically-accurate carriage doors, based on period photographs. The building is now used by small office and retail businesses.

The adjoining garage extension, which is not part of the protected historic property, has undergone more drastic changes in the course of its redevelopment for use as the headquarters of Bremik Construction. The original plywood facade has been replaced with a new masonry and storefront system, while its interior tongue-and-groove fir siding has been restored, and an expanded mezzanine has been constructed.

== See also ==
- Firefighting in Oregon
- National Register of Historic Places listings in Southeast Portland, Oregon
