= Portland Fire & Rescue =

City run emergency service department in Portland, Oregon

Portland Fire and Rescue
Operational area
- Country: United States
- State: Oregon
- City: Portland
- Address: 55 SW Ash St, Portland Oregon

Agency overview
- Established: January 3, 1883 (volunteer force established 1850)
- Annual calls: 91,000 (2023)
- Employees: 456 total personnel (2010); - 699 uniformed members; - 57 civilian personnel
- Annual budget: $177 million (2023)
- Staffing: Career
- Fire chief: Lauren Johnson
- EMS level: ALS
- IAFF: 43
- Motto: Always Ready, Always There

Facilities and equipment
- Battalions: 4
- Stations: 31
- Engines: 30
- Trucks: 10
- Squads: 2
- Rescues: 2
- Tenders: 1
- HAZMAT: 1
- USAR: 1
- Wildland: 4
- Fireboats: 4
- Rescue boats: 2
- Light and air: 2

Website
- Official website
- www.portlandfirefighters.org

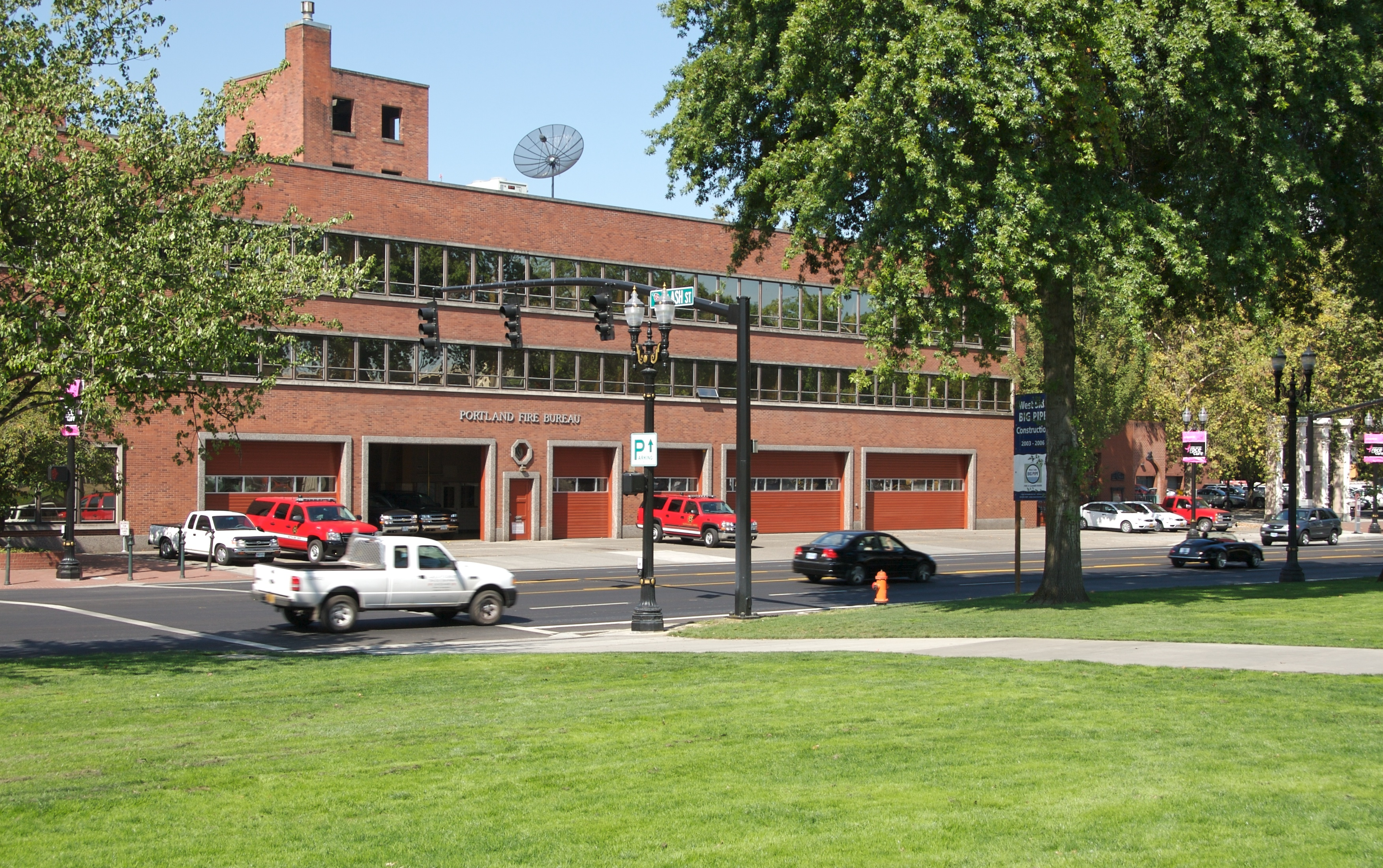
Station #1, the Headquarters of the Portland Fire Bureau

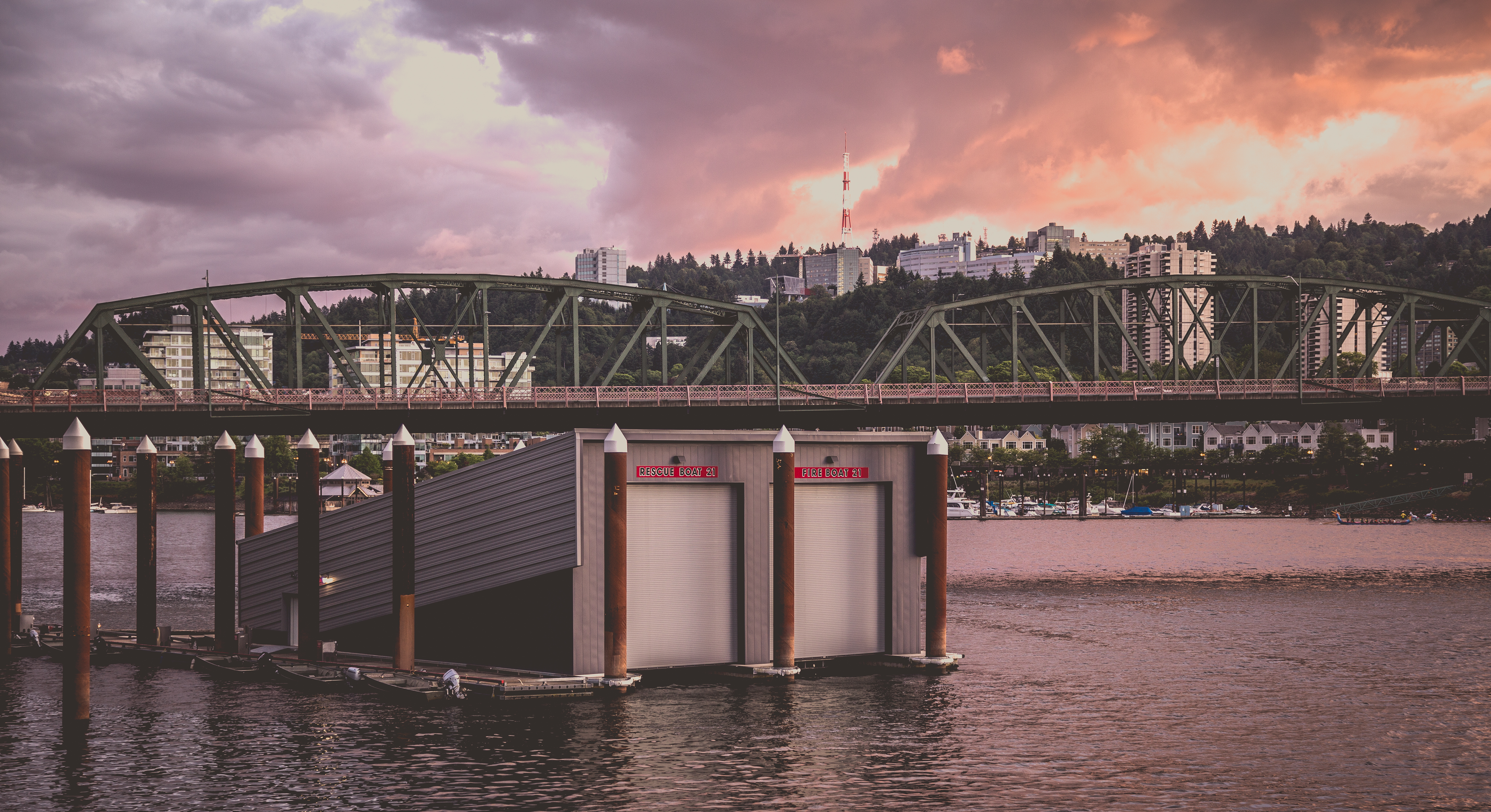
Portland Fire and Rescue Boathouse

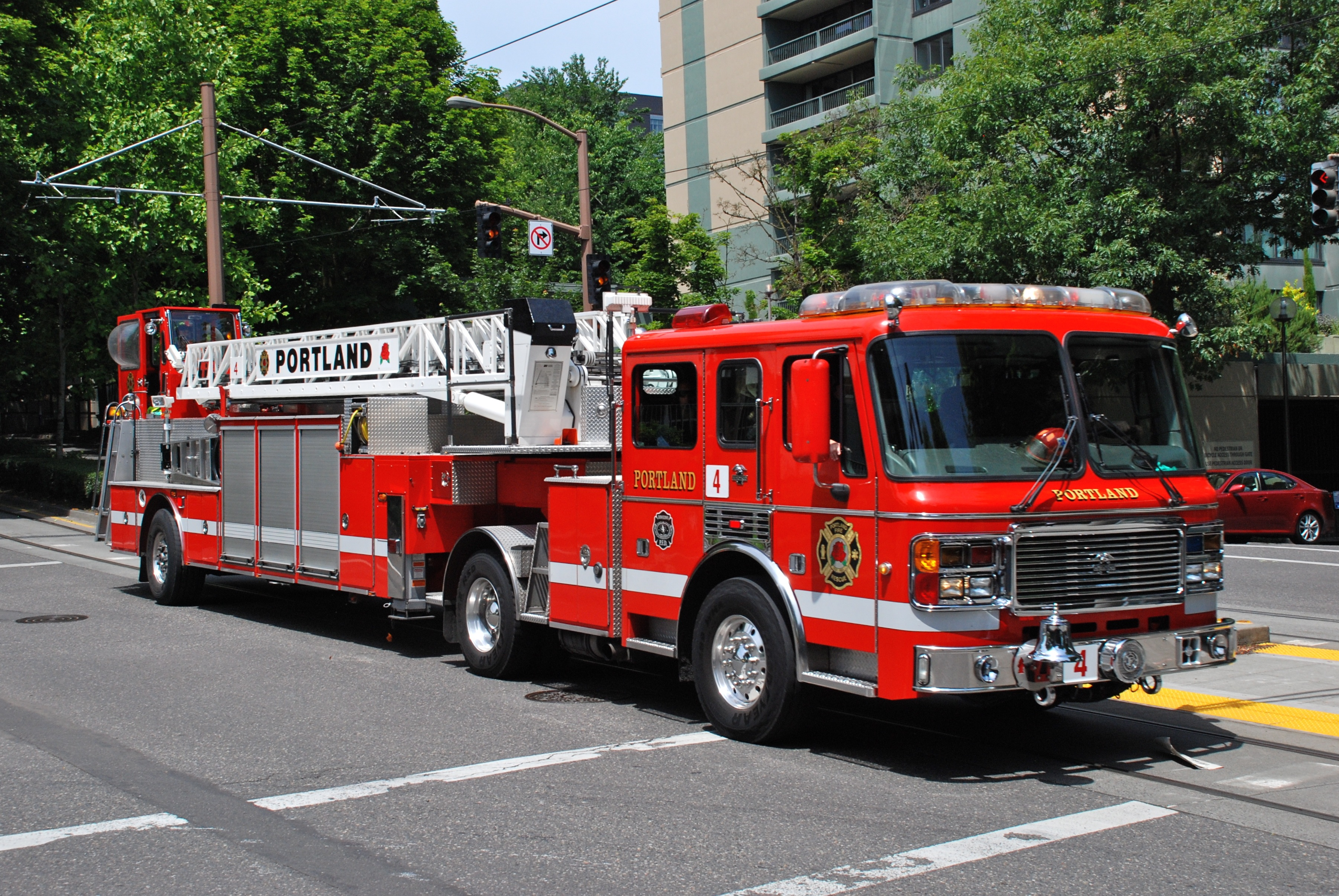
Truck #4

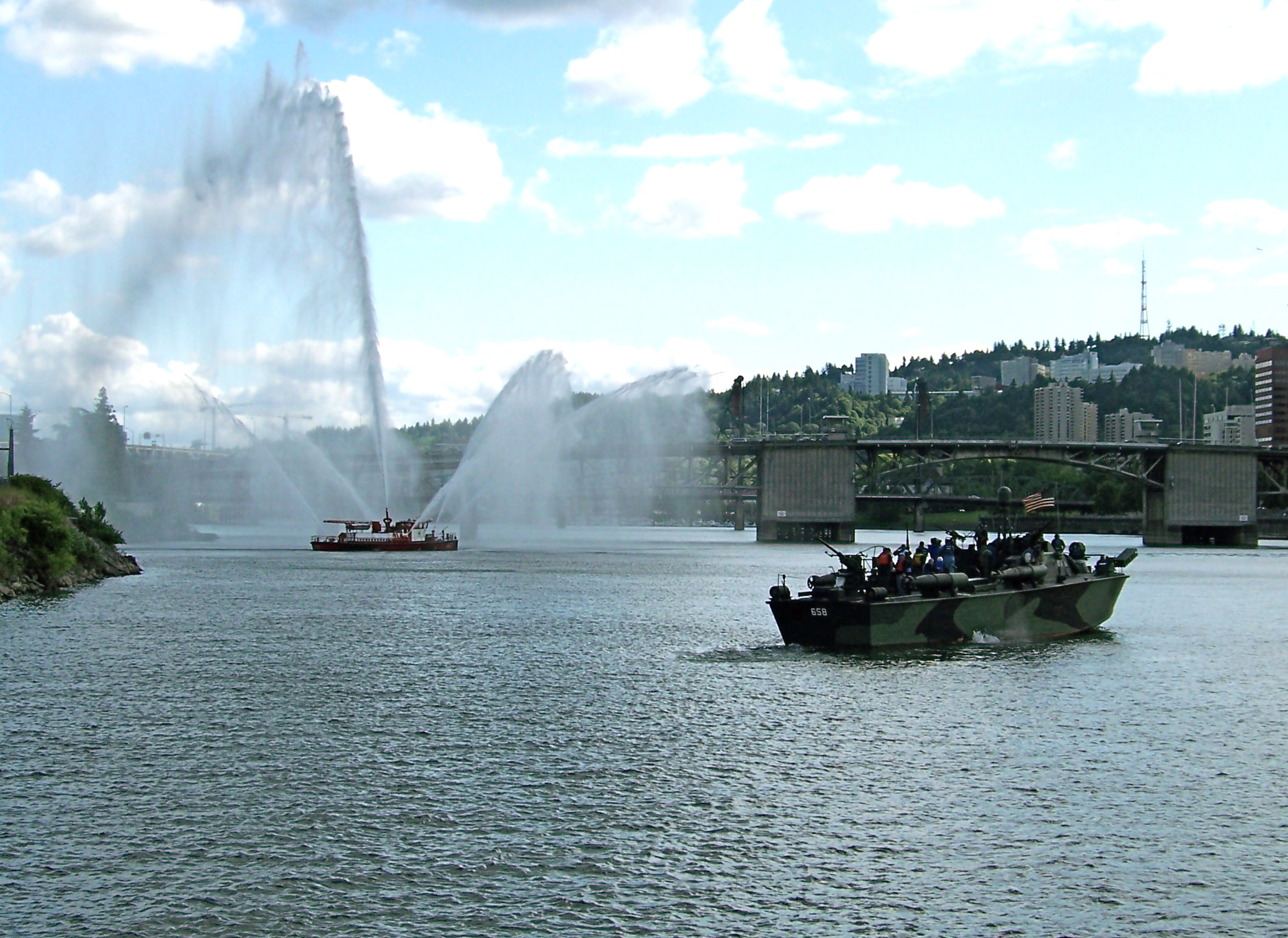
A Fireboat in the background during the Portland Rose Festival's Fleet Week

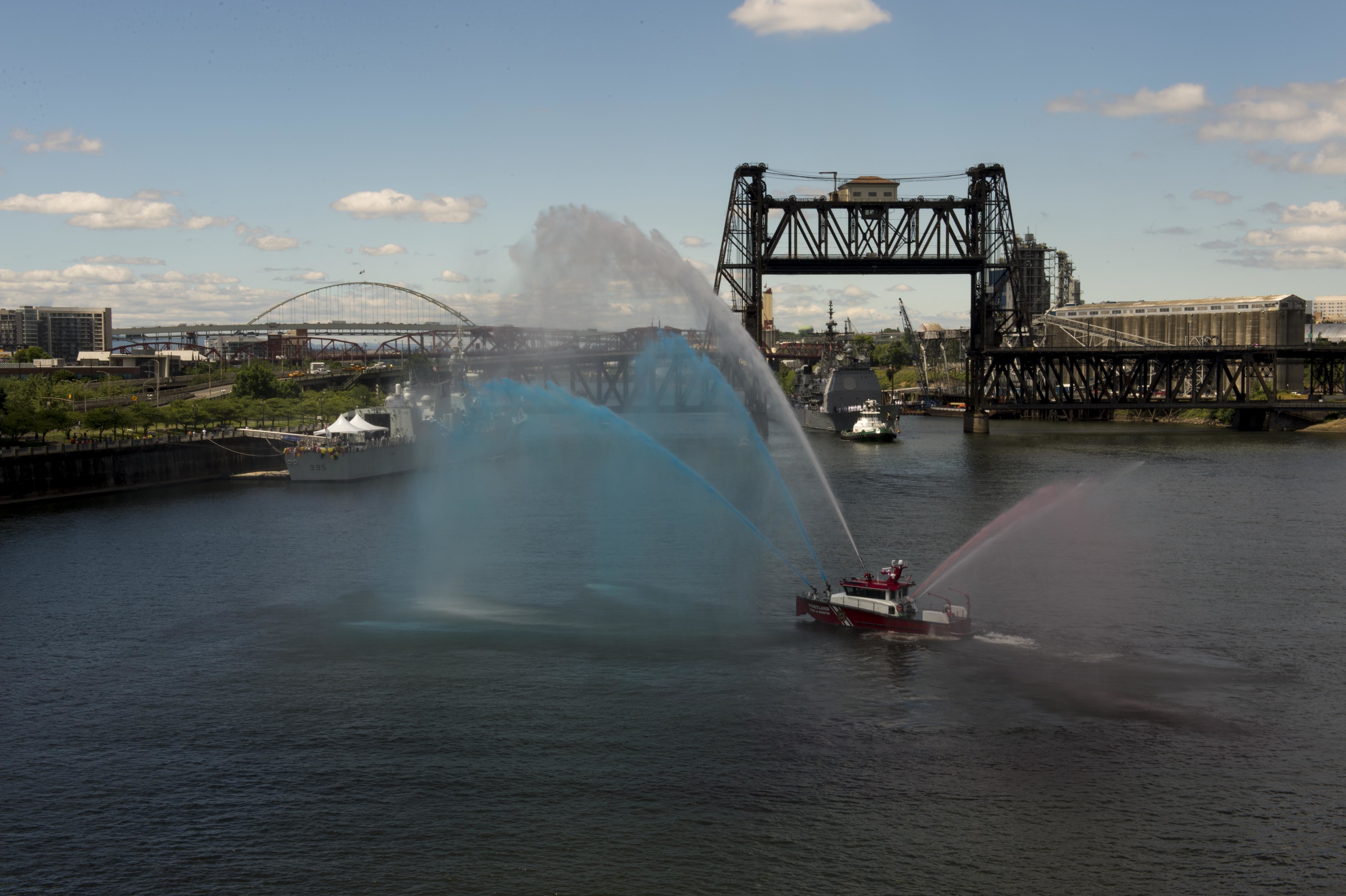
A Portland Fireboat during Portland Rose Festival's Fleet Week

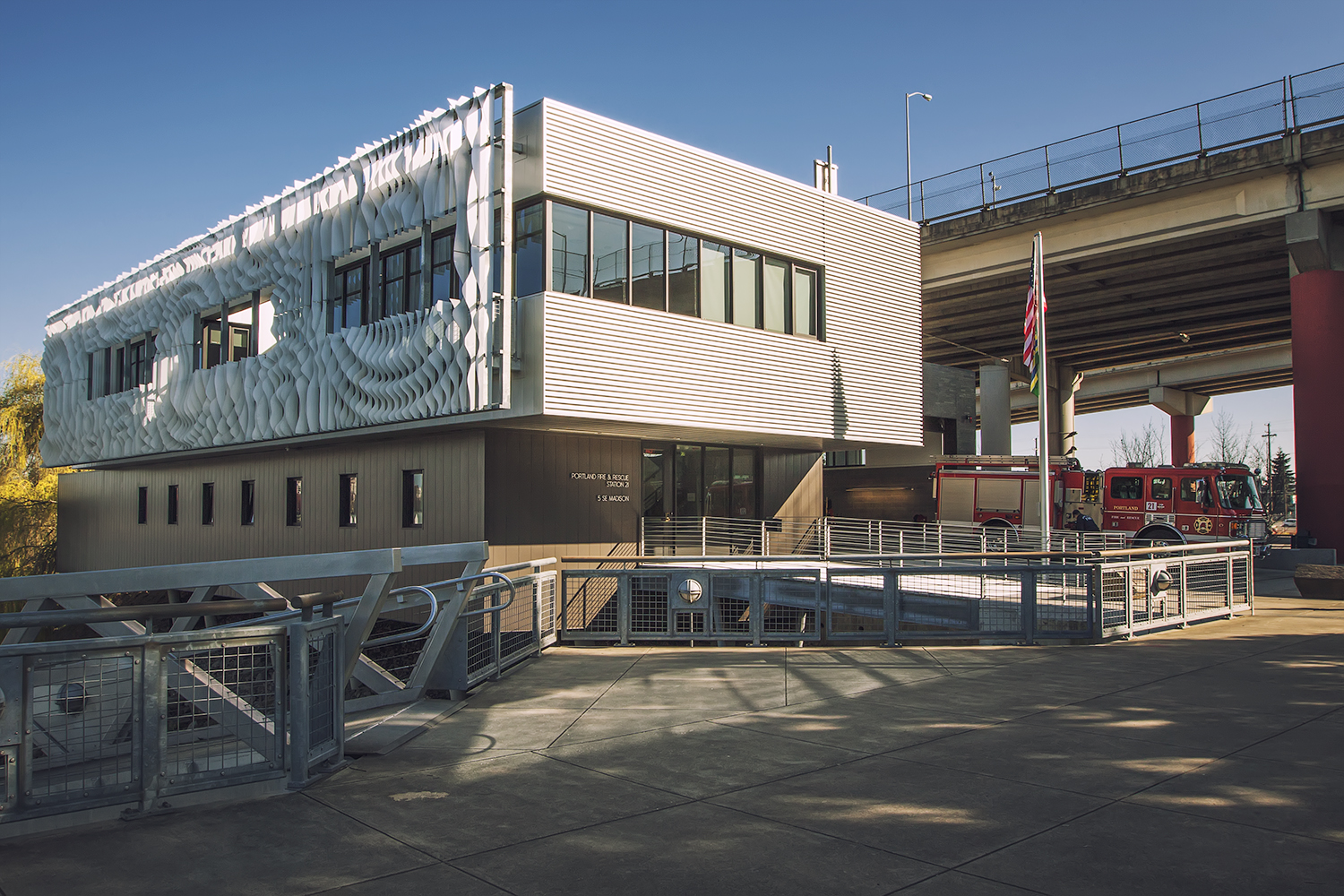
Station 21, Portland's newest fire station. It is located on the shore of the Willamette River next to the boathouses.

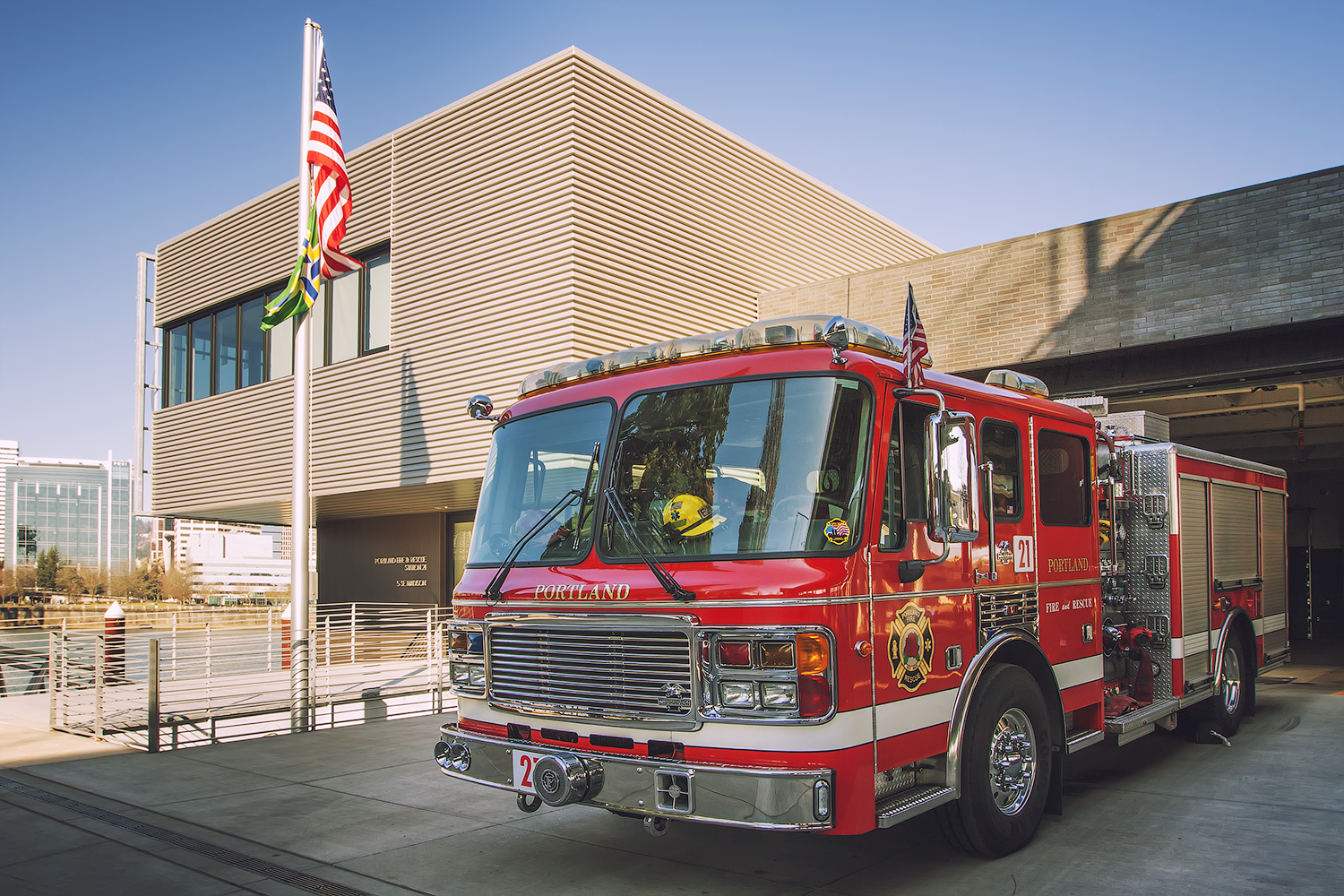
An engine at Station 21

Portland Fire and Rescue, also known as the Portland Fire Bureau, and sometimes unofficially as the Portland Fire Department, is the principle fire suppression, prevention, and rescue agency of the City of Portland, Oregon, United States. The department is the largest fire protection and emergency medical services provider in the state of Oregon, responsible for an area of 151 square miles (390 km^{2}), serving a population of over 635,000.

== History ==
Portland's fire department has its origins in the year 1850. Seeing the need for a more organized firefighting force in the growing community, Oregonian editor Colonel Thomas Dryer began writing editorial pieces in the paper about the need for a volunteer firefighting force. Failing to see a group form, Dryer took the idea into his own hands and recruited a group of 37 men to volunteer for the first firefighting company in Portland; this group became known as the Pioneer Fire Engine Company No. 1. While only having a hand pump to fight fires with, Dryer desired to find funding for a steam engine for his company. In April 1851 Portland was incorporated into a city by the Oregon Territorial Legislature. On May 6, 1851, Dryer offered his company's firefighting services to the City Council. The city council voted to approve Dryer's recommendation. Despite the council's passage of a bill to purchase a steam engine for the company, it was never acquired due to mayor Hugh O'Bryant's refusal to sign the bill.

A new city charter was adopted in 1852 that allowed the Portland to form a city fire department. In May 1853, Dryer was appointed the Chief Warden in charge of the new fire department. A resolution was passed by the city council that stated:

“Resolved. That the whole city be a district for the organization of a Hook and Ladder company; and further, that all that portion of the city lying north of Washington street, be one district for the organization of an engine company and all that part of the city south of that street be another district for the same purpose.”

A fire at a steam mill in 1853 illustrated the need for an organized firefighting force, and on July 29, 1853, the Vigilance Hook and Ladder Company No. 1 was created, consisting of 36 volunteers. On August 6 of the same year 22 volunteers formed the Willamette Engine Company No. 1 covering the Southern District. Willamette Engine Company No. 1 acquired an engine owned by future mayor of Portland, George W. Vaughn and the first engine house in Portland was built on a donated lot on Yamhill Street., bordered by 1st, 2nd, and Morrison. The Portland City Council purchased a hand pump for the company in 1856, which was later replaced by a 2nd Class Amos keag steam apparatus. While these companies together formed the Portland Fire Department, each company had its own by-laws and constitution, and were in many ways operated as separate entities.

On May 22, 1854, the Portland city council passed an ordinance establishing the Portland Fire Department. H. W. Davis was elected as the first "chief engineer" (or chief), replacing the chief warden, and was reelected to the position in 1855 and 1856. On July 4 of the same year, the volunteers of the Portland Fire Department displayed their new uniforms, black pantaloons, red shirts, black cravats, and navy caps. Due to their uniform shirts, people started referring to the firefighters as "redshirts," a name that stuck with them for some time.

In January 1856, the city council ordered that cisterns were to be built under the city streets, in order to provide a water source for the fire department. There were originally nine wooden cisterns throughout the city, measuring 15' by 9'. These proved to be difficult to upkeep, and the city began using brick for these cisterns.

An attempt had been made in 1853 to put together an engine company for the northern district, however that district never obtained an engine or engine house, and never became an operating company, leaving little historical information about them. As such, there was no engine company covering the northern district until the Multnomah Engine Company No. 2 was formed on November 26, 1856. Initially using Vaughn's small engine, money was later raised to purchase a Hunneman hand pump engine for this company.

In 1857, businessman S. J. McCormick was elected chief. A reorganization of the department in 1857 brought the Willamette Company no. 1, the Multnomah Engine Company no. 2 and Vigilance Hook and Ladder Company no. 1 into the Portland Fire Department, which thereupon had a total of 157 members (volunteer firefighters). Another reorganization in June 1859 added the Columbia Engine Company no. 3 to the department; it was the first engine company in Portland to use horses. As the city's population grew, additional fire companies were organized, including the Protection Engine Company no. 4, in November 1862; the Tiger Company no. 5, in 1873; and the Couch Engine Company no. 6, in 1880.

While the city was going through a drought, on August 2, 1873, the Great Fire of 1873 broke out at the Hurgren and Shindler furniture shop at the corner of First & Taylor. The alarm bell at the Willamette Fire Company #1 was drowned out by the noise of the fire and not heard. The fire quickly spread, and twelve hours later, twenty-two blocks of the city had been burned. The cause of the fire was never determined; however, it was suspected that arson was the cause. Due to the alarm not being heard, the city ordered a new alarm bell which could be heard as far away as Oregon City. In 1875 the system was replaced by alarm boxes and engine gongs connected through telegraph wires. In 1879 the members of the department's five companies totaled 375.

=== Portland Paid Fire Department ===
In 1883 the Portland Fire Department, while still augmented by volunteers, became known as the Portland Paid Fire Department. In January of this year, the department submitted it first budget totaling $55,340 for the entire year, with $25,940 being for the annual salary for the department's 52 employees, which included a chief engineer, two assistants, a secretary and 48 firefighters in five companies. Under this new name, the volunteer companies in the downtown area were replaced by full-time firefighters, while the volunteers still responded to alarms and worked side by side with the full-time staff. Unlike today, firefighters during this time did not work shifts and they rarely left or traveled far from their station houses, with many actually living in the fire station. Paid firefighters worked seven-day weeks, getting only 12 hours off during an entire week.

The importance of volunteers expanded in 1891 when Portland consolidated with the cities of East Portland and Albina, more than doubling the size of the city.

In 1904 the department officially became a fully paid fire department, with the temporary firefighters being paid for their time served. Even still, some outlying areas in the city felt they needed additional protection, and continued to operate volunteer companies, with these companies being provided resources by the city fire department. Most of these volunteer companies were gone by the 1930s. The City of Portland provided the funds for the department to purchase its first fire boat, the George H. Williams, in 1904.

By 1906 firefighters with the Portland Fire Department had begun wearing turnout gear. The same year also saw Chief Engineer Campbell elected President of the Pacific Coast Fire Chief's Association. With the automobile becoming more available after the turn of the century, the department began purchasing motorized apparatus in 1909. Two years later, in 1911, the department purchased its last horse-drawn piece of equipment, enabling the department to become completely motorized by 1920.

Due to the department's ranks being cut after the start of World War II, volunteer firefighting returned to Portland. While not part of the front-line firefighting forces, auxiliary companies were created and given reserve status, with their own company numbers. Following the end of the War, the auxiliary forces expanded, having their own officers and chiefs through seven districts. When the city of Portland withdrew from the Federal Civil Defense Administration in 1963, all forms of volunteer firefighting in the city disappeared.

In August 2025, following a report to Internet Crimes Against Children Task Force about illegal contents. The illegal contents, a child sexual assault contents was determined to have been uploaded from an IP address belonging to the fire station. A firefighter turned himself into jail in April 2026.

== Fire stations and apparatus ==
As of May 2016, the department operates out of 31 fire stations strategically located the city.

Fire Station Number	Location	Address	Engine Company	Truck Company	Rescue Units	Special/Support Units	Chief Units
1 (Portland Fire Bureau Headquarters)	Old Town	55 SW Ash Street	Engine 1	Truck 1		Rescue Craft 1 Technical Rescue Unit 1 Urban Search and Rescue Unit 1 Heavy Rescue Squad 1 Utility 1	Deputy Chief 103
2	Parkrose	4800 NE 122nd Avenue	Engine 2	Truck 2			
3	Northwest/Pearl District	1715 NW Johnson Street	Engine 3	Truck 3			Battalion Chief 1
4	Portland State University	511 SW College Street	Engine 4	Truck 4			
5	Hillsdale	1505 SW DeWitt Street	Engine 5		Rescue 99	Rehabilitation Unit 5	
6	Northwest Industrial	3660 NW Front Avenue	Engine 6			Fireboat 6 Fireboat 6R (reserve)	
7	Mill Park	1500 SE 122nd Avenue	Engine 7	Truck 7		HazMat Coordinator 458 HazMat 7 Recon 7	Battalion Chief 3
8	Kenton	7134 North Maryland Avenue		Truck 8			
9	Hawthorne	1706 SE Cesar E. Chavez Blvd	Engine 9			MC9	Battalion Chief 4
10	Burlingame	451 SW Taylors Ferry Road	Engine 10	Truck 10			
11	Lents	5707 SE 92nd Avenue	Engine 11		Rescue 11		
12	Sandy Blvd.	8645 NE Sandy Boulevard	Engine 12			Squad 12	
13	Lloyd	926 NE Weidler Street	Engine 13	Truck 13		Water Tender 13	
14	Alberta	1905 NE Killingsworth Street	Engine 14			Brush Unit 14	
15	Portland Heights	1920 SW Spring St	Engine 15				
16	Sylvan	1715 SW Skyline	Engine 16			Brush Unit 16 Water Tender 16	
17	Hayden Island	848 North Tomahawk Island Drive	Engine 17			Fireboat 17 Fireboat 17R (reserve) Rescue Boat 17	
18	Multnomah Village	8720 SW 30th Avenue	Engine 18			Brush Unit 18 Heavy Squad 18	
19	Mt. Tabor	7301 East Burnside Street	Engine 19		Rescue 19 (Brush Unit)	Rehabilitation Unit 19	
20	Sellwood	2235 SE Bybee Boulevard	Engine 20				
21	Eastbank	5 SE Madison St.	Engine 21			Fireboat 21 Rescue Boat 21 Utility 21	
22	St. Johns	7205 North Alta Street	Engine 22	Truck 22		Brush Unit 22 Utility 22	
23	Lower Southeast	2915 SE 13th Place	Engine 23		Rescue 23		
24	Overlook/Swan Island	4515 North Maryland Street	Engine 24			Foam Unit 24 Heavy Squad Unit 24	Battalion Chief 2
25	Woodstock	5211 SE Mall Street	Engine 25	Truck 25			
26	Portsmouth/University Park	5247 North Lombard Street	Engine 26				
27	Forest Heights	3130 NW Skyline Boulevard	Engine 27			Brush Unit 27	
28	Hollywood	5540 NE Sandy Boulevard	Engine 28				
29	Powellhurst	13310 SE Foster Road	Engine 29			Brush Unit 29 ATV29	
30	Gateway	13313 NE San Rafael Street	Engine 30			Rehabilitation Unit 30	
31	Rockwood	1927 SE 174th Avenue	Engine 31		Rescue 31		

Legend

Callsign	Full title
Truck Companies	PF&R operates tiller trucks, tower trucks and quint trucks all under the callsign "Truck". Truck Companies have the equipment needed for responding to a variety of emergencies including Motor Vehicle Accidents, Medical calls, fire and rescue emergencies and other calls.
Engine Companies	Engine Companies carry various firefighting tools and equipment as well as basic medical gear.
Heavy Rescue Squad	PF&R operates one heavy rescue squad.This Unit is located at Station 1. This Unit carries a wide variety of specialized Rescue Tools and Equipment including the Jaws Of Life Hydraulic Rescue Tools Systems (Spreaders, Cutters, Combi Tools, Etc), Air Bags, Specialized Air, Electric and Battery Operated Power Tools, Specialized Rescue Saws, Specialized Cutting Torches, Rope Rescue Equipment, Trench Rescue Equipment, Emergency Medical Services Equipment and other Specialized Tools and Equipment.
Medical Rescue Units	Medical Rescue Units Respond to medical emergency situations. Heart Monitors and Defibrillators, Medications, Oxygen Equipment, Intubation and Airway Management Supplies and other Specialized Medical Equipment are carried on these vehicles
Heavy Squad	The Heavy Squad units are assigned to Chemical, Biological, Radiological, Nuclear And High Yield Explosives (CBRNE) responses, along with responding to high-rise fires. There is a variety of CBRNE response equipment as well as equipment for fighting fires in High-Rise buildings on these units.
Foam Unit	Foam is an agent that can be used in any fire situation including vehicle fires, high rise fires and other fires. Foam equipment and other firefighting supplies are carried on the Foam Unit
Fire Boat	Fireboats are unique to Portland and areas surrounding it. they have high amounts of water on board and they can be set up for first aid if needed
Rescue Boat	Rescue boats have equipment that can be used in any rescue situation on the water or on land.
Rescue Craft	Rescue Craft operate specially outfitted SeaDoos which respond to water rescues from Station 1. Although they don't have regular emergency equipment, they are useful on the water and respond to any emergency on the water.
Chief Units	The Portland Fire and Rescue Bureau has one Deputy Chief and Four Battalion Chiefs. The Battalion Chiefs and the Deputy Chief have the responsibility of making sure everything is going well not only on an emergency scene but also at their respective stations. The Battalion Chiefs and Deputy Chief have vehicles that are equipped and designed for their duties.
Brush Units	Brush Units respond to brush fires and emergencies in areas not accessible by normal fire apparatus. These Units have Brush fire equipment and other items that are used in brush fire scenes and other emergencies if needed.
Jeep Units	Jeep Units respond to emergencies in areas and weather conditions not accessible by normal fire apparatus. Jeep Units have equipment that can assist in any situation where other fire apparatus can't go.
Utility	Utility units operate ATVs which respond to emergency situations on trails and other areas not accessible by normal fire apparatus). Utility ATVs can be equipped with firefighting tools and medical equipment in case of a fire or other emergency where other apparatus can't go.
Hazardous Materials (HazMat) unit	The Hazardous Materials (HazMat) unit deals with a wide variety of Hazardous Materials Situations. There is a variety of Hazardous Materials supplies and equipment including head protection gear, HazMat clothing and other equipment on the Hazardous Materials Unit.
Hazardous Materials (HazMat) Conditions Unit	The Hazardous Materials (HazMat) Conditions Unit is responsible for responding to Hazardous Materials calls and can assist the HazMat Unit and has additional equipment for all Hazardous Materials Incidents.
Rehab Unit	The Rehabilitation unit is tasked with providing rehabilitation and help for those who have been affected by any major emergency. This can include providing Drinks and Food for first responders, a place for comfort or other responsibilities at any incident.
Air Unit	The Air unit is equipped with extra air bottles and sources for lighting and air during fires or other incidents.
Technical Rescue Unit	The Technical Rescue Unit is a specialized vehicle that has an extensive array of specialized tools and equipment for any type of technical rescue. The Jaws Of Life Hydraulic Rescue Tools Systems (Spreaders, Cutters, Combi Tools, Rams, Etc), Air Bags, Specialized Air, Electric and Battery Operated Power Tools, Specialized Rescue Saws, Specialized Cutting Torches, Rope Rescue Equipment, Emergency Medical Services Equipment and Other Specialized Tools and Equipment are located on the Technical Rescue Unit.
Urban Search And Rescue (USAR) Unit	Urban Search And Rescue (USAR) is when specialized personnel and specialized Tools and Equipment are needed for any Urban Search and Rescue Incident. The Jaws of Life Hydraulic Rescue Tools Systems (Spreaders, Cutters, Rams, Combi Tools, Etc), Specialized Rescue Saws, Specialized Air, Electric and Battery Operated Power Tools, Rope Rescue Equipment, Trench Rescue Equipment, Emergency Medical Services Equipment and Other Specialized Tools and Equipment are found on the Urban Search And Rescue Unit

== Line-of-duty deaths ==
Since the establishment of Portland Fire & Rescue, 75 firefighters have died while on duty or as a result of their job. Portland firefighters who have died as a result of their occupation are:

Firefighter	Rank	Date of Death	Details
James Reed	Volunteer Firefighter	August 21, 1881	Collapsed from a heart attack after pulling a hand-drawn fire engine to the scene of a fire on August 16. Died at a hospital 5 days later.
Fred Wagner		February 28, 1890	Struck in head by nozzle while testing a new fire engine at the corner of SW 7th & Salmon.
Tom O’Keefe		August 21, 1891	While en route to a fire at 16th & Burnside, O'Keefe fell from vehicle while rounding a corner and was crushed under the wheels.
John G Hewston		October 3, 1892	Died from a fractured skull after being knocked from his ladder by falling timber while fighting a fire in the Kamm Block (SW 1st & Pine).
Tom Grenfell		March 25, 1896	Died from injuries sustained while responding to a fire call in January 1896. Grenfell fell while pulling a fire truck up a steep grade, badly injuring himself. He sustained a similar injury a few days prior to his death, resulting in his admitting himself to the hospital for surgery on a perforated appendix.
David Campbell	Chief	June 26, 1911	Campbell entered a fire at the Union Oil building at SE Salmon & Walter to evacuate his crew from an impending building collapse. Campbell's crew evacuated the building, but it collapsed on him before he was able to get out.
William Higdon		June 6, 1912	While driving Engine 6, Higdon was thrown under the engine and dragged 100 feet (30 m), dying at the scene.
Emil Gustafson		March 16, 1916	Was electrocuted after coming in contact with a 10,000-volt power line while working on telegraph wires for the fire alarm at NW 26th & Nicolai.
Francis H. McCormick		August 15, 1919	Died fighting a fire at the Northwest Box Company in SW Portland after being struck with a fire hose, causing him to fall from a train trestle.
Karl Gunster		June 15, 1921	Suffocated in a fire on the third floor of the May Apartments at SW 14th & Taylor.
Oscar H. Lehman		October 3, 1921	Died as a result of a skull fracture received following an accident between two fire engines at SW 4th & Jefferson.
James S. Baldwin		June 19, 1922	Electrocuted in basement of home at 387 Yamhill after contacting a live drop cord and falling in water from the firefighting efforts.
Oscar B. Gabriel		October 25, 1922	Died under a wall collapse fighting fire at Washington High School.
Fred H. Rittenour		February 1, 1923	Fell from loft at Station 19 (6049 SE Stark).
Adolph W. Wefel	Lieutenant	June 1, 1923	A chimney fell collapsed on Wefel at North Benton Ave. & Clackamas St. during overhaul.
William E. Wilbur		April 7, 1926	Had a seizure and then heart attack while fighting a fire at 848 NE Clackamas St.
Charles A. Ryan		May 20, 1928	Died with Firefighter William McCreery when a safety belt holding him to McCreery broke, causing them to both fall to their deaths. Ryan & McCreery were practicing Rose Festival Parade Ladder Drill Team at SW Taylor & Chapman.
William John McCreery		May 20, 1928	Died with Firefighter Charles Ryan when a safety belt holding Ryan to McCreery broke, causing them to both fall to their deaths. Ryan & McCreery were practicing Rose Festival Parade Ladder Drill Team at SW Taylor & Chapman.
Harry Josephson		July 23, 1928	Fell from a power pole at SE 51st & Hawthorne suffering a skull fracture while working on the fire alarm system.
Walter McBride		December 19, 1929	Found unconscious in bed at Station 9 (900 SE 35th) and taken to the hospital, where he was later pronounced dead.
Richard D. Laisner		July 4, 1930	Died of a heart attack while fighting a fire at SE 37th Ave.
Henry Krimbel		October 23, 1932	Fell through a skylight at the Councelor Apartments on August 16, 1930. Krimbel returned to work for a short time, but later died due to injuries sustained in the fall.
Clement M. Kemmer		April 21, 1933	While playing handball, as part of a physical fitness program at Station #8(45 NE Russell St), died from a heart attack.
Gustave A. Stephan	Inspector	June 26, 1933	Died of a heart attack at 68 NE Stanton while on duty.
Frank L. Kearney		January 7, 1934	Kearney was killed, and nine other firefighters injured, during an accident between Engine 21 and Squad 1 at the intersection of SW 4th & Pine while responding to the Holly Dairy at 406 NW 14th.
Harry B. Morrow		July 1, 1934	Died of a heart attack at SE 17th & Division fighting an automobile fire.
Harry U. Gardner		January 19, 1935	Died of a heart attack while fighting a fire at NE 57th & Sandy.
William D. Heath		March 18, 1935	Died from a heart attack at Station 22 (1233 SW 1st) after responding earlier to a fire at the Hotel Lindquist.
Frank A. Platt		March 11, 1937	Was crushed between Engine 10 and the wall at Station 10 (5830 SW Kelly) while inspecting the engine. The driver mistakenly put the vehicle in reverse.
Harry R. Howard		December 31, 1939	Died of a heart attack while on duty at Station 36 (5247 N. Lombard).
Ernest W. Bills		June 3, 1940	Died from carbon monoxide poisoning in a fire at the Portland Furniture Manufacturing Company (5331 SW Macadam) when his canister mask failed. Firefighter Carl Markstrom suffered the same fate trying to safe Bills.
Carl. G. Markstrom		June 3, 1940	Died in a fire at the Portland Furniture Manufacturing Company (5331 SW Macadam) while trying to save Firefighter Ernest Bills, who also died in the fire.
Peter P. Kumpf		December 5, 1940	Died from a heart ailment while on duty at Station 23 (1917 SE 7th).
Owen Peterson		1943	
Elmo St. Clair Bradford		October 25, 1944	Died while fighting a roadside fire at SW Broadway & Hoffman.
Joseph F. Allerton		October 2, 1945	Allerton commanded the fireboat at the Oregon Shipyard Fire on August 30, 1945. He became ill after the fire, and later died of bronchial pneumonia, having never returned to work.
William Inglesby		July 19, 1946	Died while on duty at Station 33 (10803 NW Front)
Gregory A. Warner		December 30, 1946	Suffered a heart attack on December 23 after returning from a fire at 2401 NW 23rd Ave, he died a week later.
Marion Stark		March 31, 1947	Died of a heart attack in bed at Station 8 (45 NE Russell).
Alfred E. Berg		November 2, 1948	Died of a heart attack while fighting a fire in a commercial building at 8950 N Bradford.
Daniel G. Shaw		April 24, 1949	Died of a heart attack while at a house fire at 432 NE Russell.
Victor D. Brown		December 4, 1957	Died of acute pneumonia and arterial sclerosis. No further details.
John Drain		1960	
John T. Metcalf		August 14, 1960	Died when Truck 7 was in an accident with a bus at the intersection of SE 12th & Hawthorne, throwing him from the vehicle.
Benjamin Steele		1963	
Frank Benedict		1963	
Robert Edner		1965	
James Hamilton		1965	
Virgil L. Spencer		October 29, 1966	Fell from a catwalk at the BP Johns Furniture Company fire when flames from a sawdust bin shot up towards him.
Louis Merchant		1969	
Randy Hammer		1970	
Donald Turner		1971	
Roy A. Bray		1971	
Jack Stephens		February 8, 1971	Stephens died of an apparent heart attack following Run #843 to 329 SW Woods for a “smoke scare.” After returning he went to bed and was found deceased at shift change at Fire Station #2 at 630 SW Gaines Road.
Aldro Stuck		1972	
Jefferson Morris		1974	
Melvin Sethmann		1975	
John L. Devaney		February 15, 1977	Died from a heart attack while fighting a fire at 4000 SW Shattuck Road.
Charles Weberg		1979	
Tommy Tucker		1984	
Willis Hubener		1987	
Thomas G. Tyner		1987	
Richard H. Bradley		1988	
Lonnie M. Zimmerman		1990	
Gerald Quimby		1991	
Jeffrey S. Tuggle		April 1, 1993	Died from cancer that was caused by the cumulative effects of fire byproduct exposure during his career.
Robert J. Hebisen		1995	
Richard A. Harder		1996	
Paul T. Kahn		2001	
James T. Woodward		2002	
Jeffrey S. Calvi		2003	
Steven E Higley		December 30, 2004	Died from non-Hodgkin's lymphoma that was caused by the cumulative effects of fire byproduct exposure during his career.
George L. Godson		2007	
Keith Kosky		2013	
Jerry Richardson	Lieutenant	November 21, 2021	Died from occupationally linked cancer.

== See also ==
- Firefighting in Oregon
