= Fireboats in Connecticut =

Various seaside municipalities operate fireboats in Connecticut. Following the attacks on September 11, 2001 several municipalities received grants from the US Federal government to build fireboats, so they would be prepared for a maritime terrorist attack.

fireboats in Connecticut
| image | name | homeport | entered service | retired | notes |
|---|---|---|---|---|---|
| | | Branford | 2007 | | Locally built. |
| | | Bridgeport | 2007 | | A 28 foot (8.5 m) Metalcraft Firebrand. |
| | | Bridgeport | 2013 | | A 33 foot (10 m) Safe Boats Defender. |
| | Nathan Hale | New Haven | | | A 36 foot (11 m) MetalCraft Marine Firestorm. |
| | City of Stamford | Stamford | 2013 | | A 32 foot (9.8 m) MetalCraft FireStorm. |
| | Harry E. Brewer | Norwalk | 199? | | Acquired used. |
| | Robert L. Bedell | Norwalk | 2012 | | Named after a heroic local firefighter who died in 2004. |
| | Joseph B. Herman II | Mystic, | 2012 | | Replaced an older vessel. |
