= Mount Livermore =

Mount Livermore may refer to:

- Mount Caroline Livermore, on Angel Island in California
- Mount Livermore (Texas), in the Davis Mountains of Texas
