= Fireboats in Norfolk, Virginia =

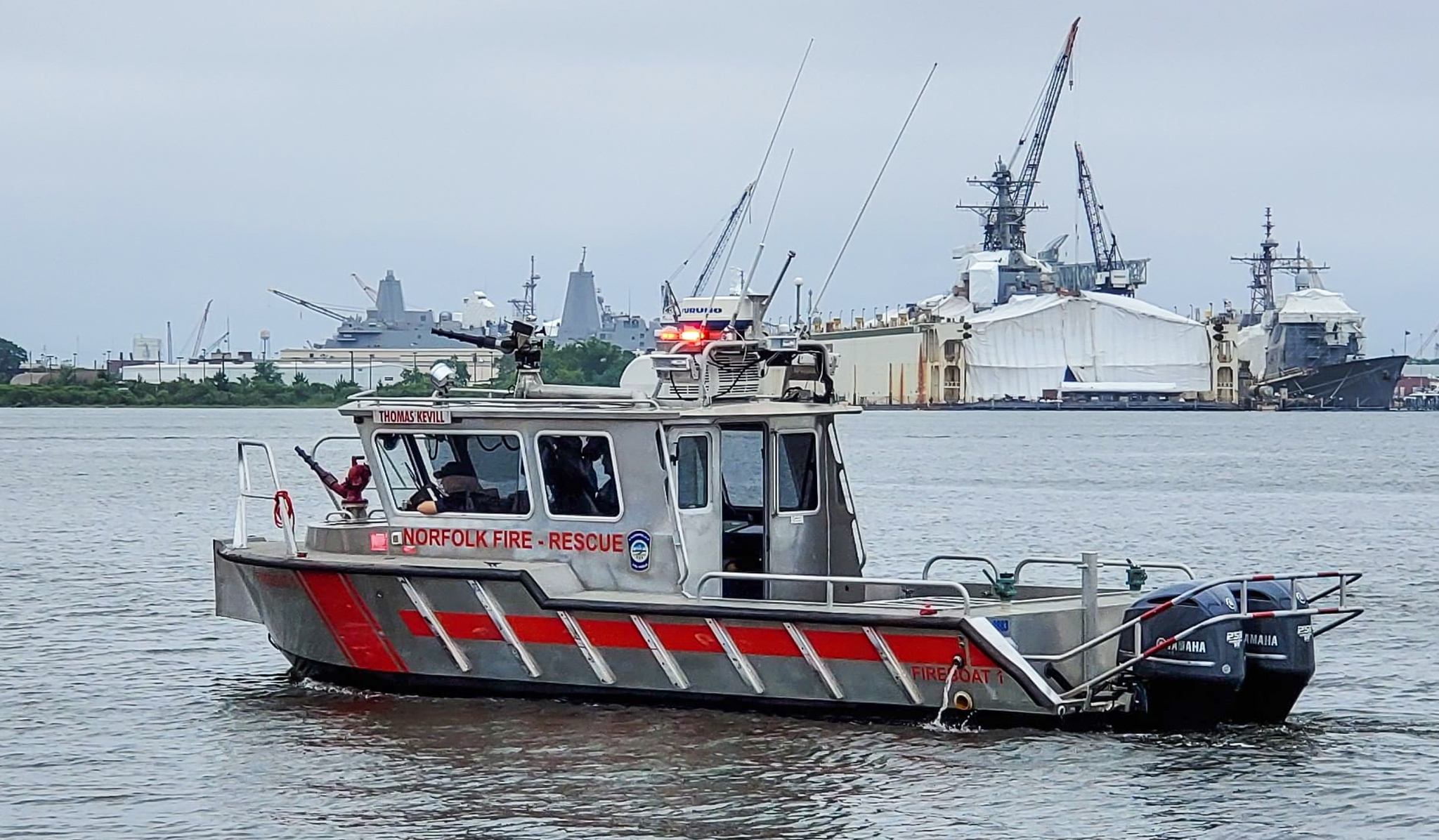
Thomas Kevill is the most recent fireboat in Norfolk.

In 1924 Norfolk, Virginia commissioned the first of a number of fireboats in Norfolk, Virginia. She was a former US Navy vessel, USS Gen. Harvey H. Brown, re-christened Vulcan. Vulcan was a steam-powered vessel, requiring a crew of 18. She could project 6,000 US gallons (23,000 L) per minute. She served until 1941.

In 2008, when Vulcan II was acquired, Norfolk's only vessel was a 22-foot (6.7 m) inflatable craft. Vulcan II could project 2,500 US gallons (9,500 L) per minute.

In 2013 she was supplemented by Thomas Kevill. She cost about half a million dollars, three quarters of which were provided through a FEMA Port Security Grant. Like other fireboats funded by FEMA, in addition to fighting fires, and search and rescue, she is sealed so she can provide a front-line response to chemical spills or attacks by chemical weapons, and to biological or radiological threats. She has advanced sensors, including infrared sensors that aid in locating a fire's hot-spots, and to picking out the heads of distressed boaters or swimmers, in the dark or under conditions of blinding fog or smoke.
