= Joseph B. Herman II =

The Mystic Connecticut fireboat Joseph B. Herman II was paid for with funds from the Port Security Grant Program, a special fund to combat terrorism. The fireboat cost $700,000. Following the attacks on September 11, 2001, the US Federal government began issuing generous grants to regional police, fire and other emergency handling agencies, to pay for infrastructure that could be used to combat a terrorist attack.

The vessel was delivered as the Marine 1 in July 2012. In September 2012, once crews had been trained, the fire department renamed the vessel the Joseph B. Herman II. The vessel's namesake had been a chief of the Mystic Fire Department in the 1960s and 70s.

The vessel has modern navigation equipment, and modern equipment for search and rescue, and to support scuba divers. The vessel is 32 feet long. She is powered by a pair 425 horsepower (317 kW) diesel engine. She is propelled by water jets, which make it easier to maneuver in shallow water. Her pumps can project 2,000 gallons per minute through her three water cannons.

== See also ==
- Fireboats in Connecticut
