= Fireboat Tiburon =

Modern fireboat

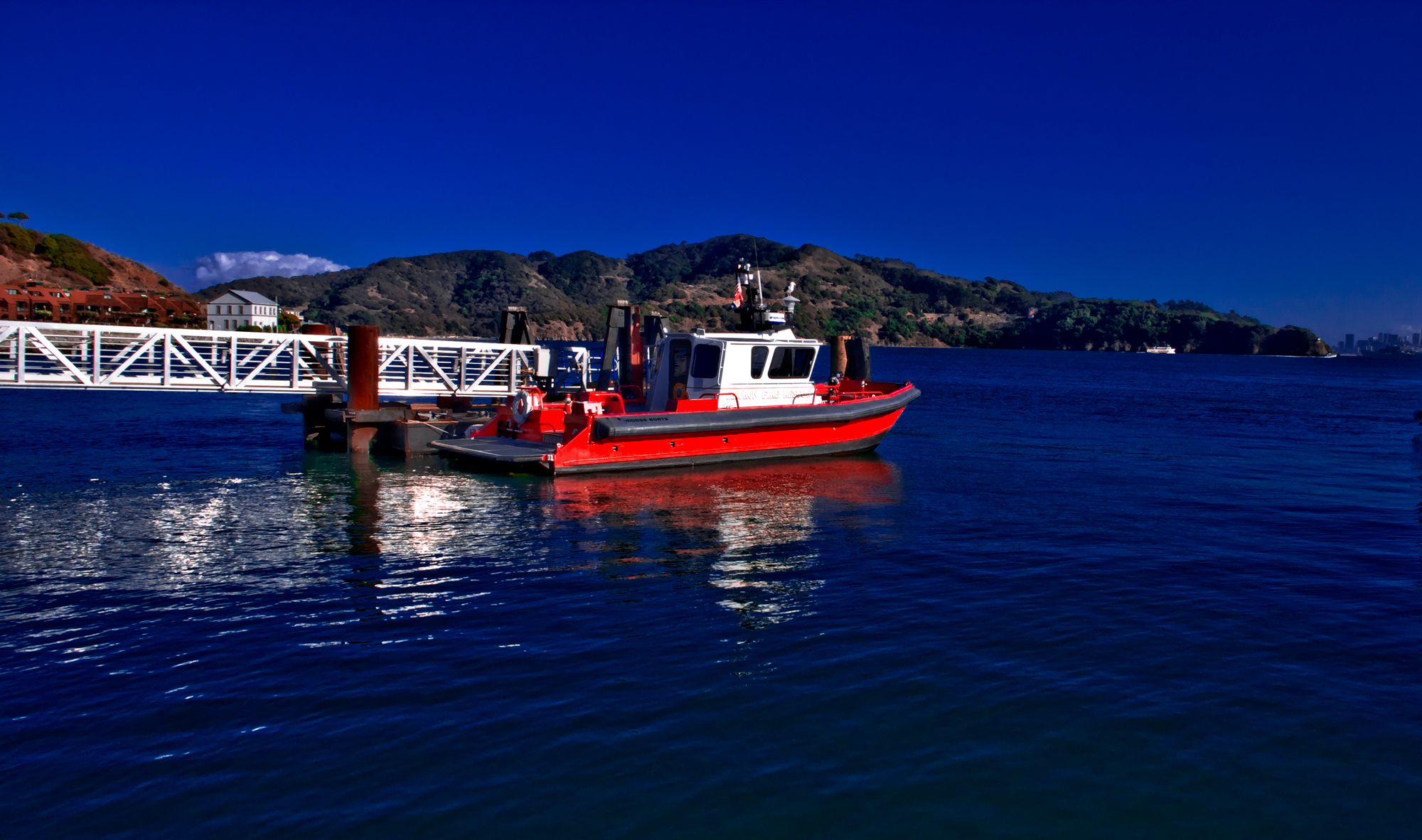
Fireboat Tiburon in 2007.

The Fireboat Tiburon is a modern 35 feet (11 m) fireboat acquired by Tiburon, California's fire department in 2006. Two thirds of the vessel's cost was paid through a Port security grant from FEMA, a sub-agency of the Department of Homeland Security. She replaced a used vessel acquired from the Los Angeles Fire Department in 2003.

== Operational history ==
On October 12, 2008, nearby Angel Island, a state park, was struck by serious brush fires. Fireboat Tiburon was one of the nearby fireboats which helped bring those fires under control.

Fireboat Tiburon has rescued recreational boaters when their vessels were ablaze, helped fight those fires, and helped prevent the burning vessels from alighting vessels moored nearby.

On April 20, 2019, the Tiburon, and several other fireboats, engaged in a search for kayakers whose craft capsized. The kayakers were ultimately rescued by a California Highway Patrol helicopter, two hours after the boaters phoned 911.

== Design ==
Fireboat Tiburon, like other fireboats purchased with the help of a port security grant, has first aid facilities and sensors for search and rescue.

The vessel is a catamaran, with a 22 inch draft, and twin 380 brake horsepower (280 kW) diesels engines power waterjets, not propellers, allowing her to be able to risk getting close to shore, without damage.

specifications
length	36.5 feet (11.1 m)
beam	13.5 feet (4.1 m)
displacement	17,000 lbs (7,711 kg)
speed	35 knots (65 km/h)
range	220 nautical miles (410 km)
power	2 x 380 brake horsepower (280 kW)
pumping capacity	750 gallons per minute
