= William H. Connerton, Jr. (fireboat) =

Newport, Rhode Island, acquired a new fireboat, named William H. Connerton, Jr. on April 23, 2018. Approximately seventy-five percent of the vessel's cost was covered by a FEMA Port Security Grant. $887,642.00 was paid for by FEMA, $267,500 was paid by the Newport Fire Department, but $200,000 of that was donated by Peter Kiernan III a local philanthropist.

== Design ==
The 37 feet (11 m) catamaran is propelled by waterjets and powere by a pair of 425 shaft horsepower (317 kW) diesel engines. Her two watercannons can project 3000 gallons per minute. Her electronics suite includes sidescan sonar, a thermal camera, and an EKG monitor for rescuing and treating the injured. Her airtight cabin is designed not only to protect her crew from smoke, but also against radiological, biological or chemical attacks. When not fighting fires she is equipped for supporting divers, for body recovery. Her thermal camera can also pick out pick out the thermal signature of boaters who have fallen overboard, when engaged on search and rescue missions.

== Namesake ==
Her namesake, William H. Connerton Jr. was a career firefighter, who retired after a term as fire chief, in 1980, who came from a family of firefighters. Both his father, William H. Connerton Sr., and his son Peter Connerton, were career firefighters, who served as fire chief. Peter was chief when the decision to acquire the vessel was made. After William H. Connerton Jr. retired he subsequently served as Newport's city manager.
