= Hartz-Booth =

Fireboat operated by the City of Huntington, West Virginia Fire Department

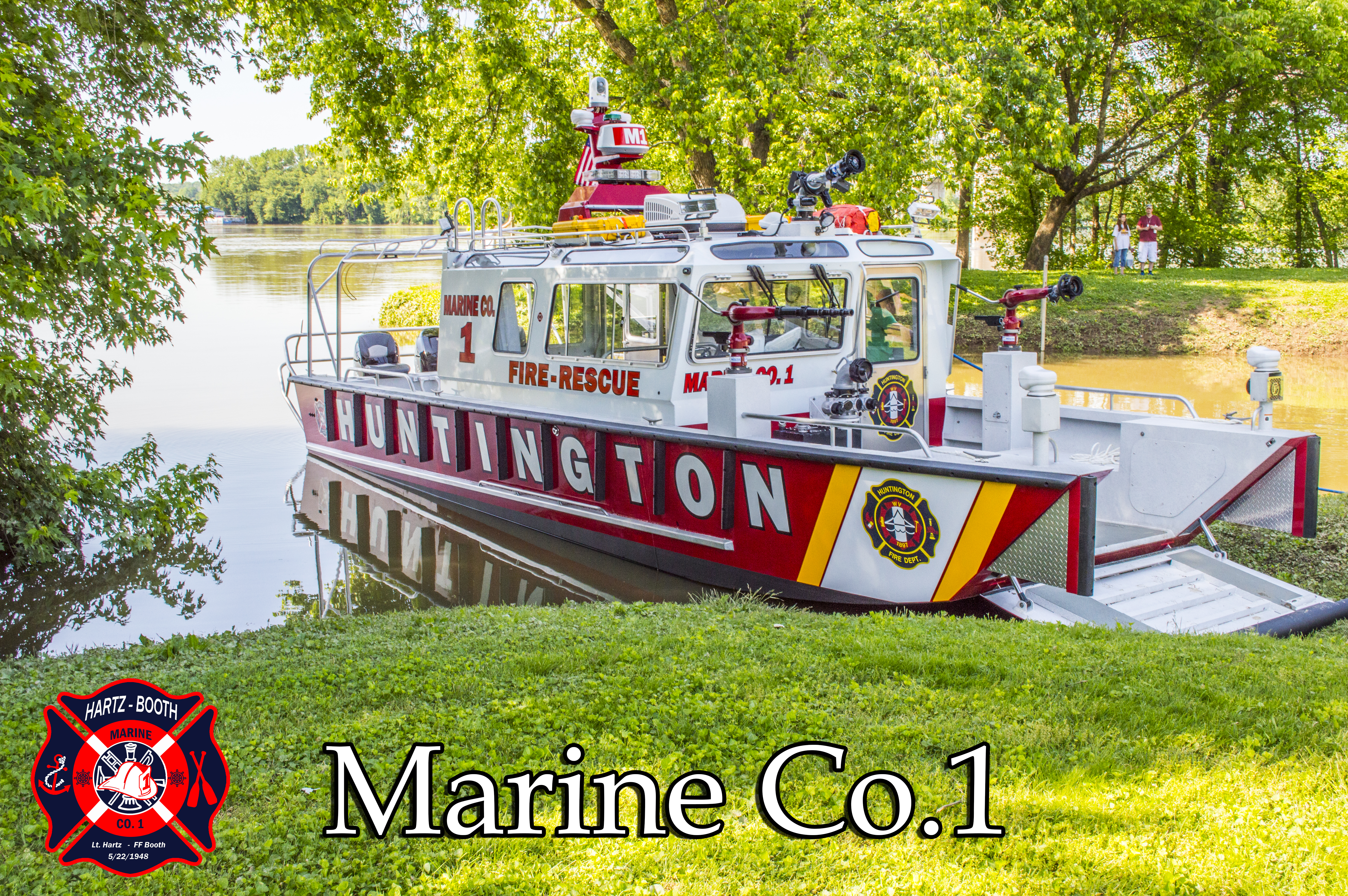
Hartz-Booth, Marine Co. 1, City of Huntington (WV) Fire Department, bow door open and moored on the south bank of the Ohio River at the Port of Huntington, West Virginia.

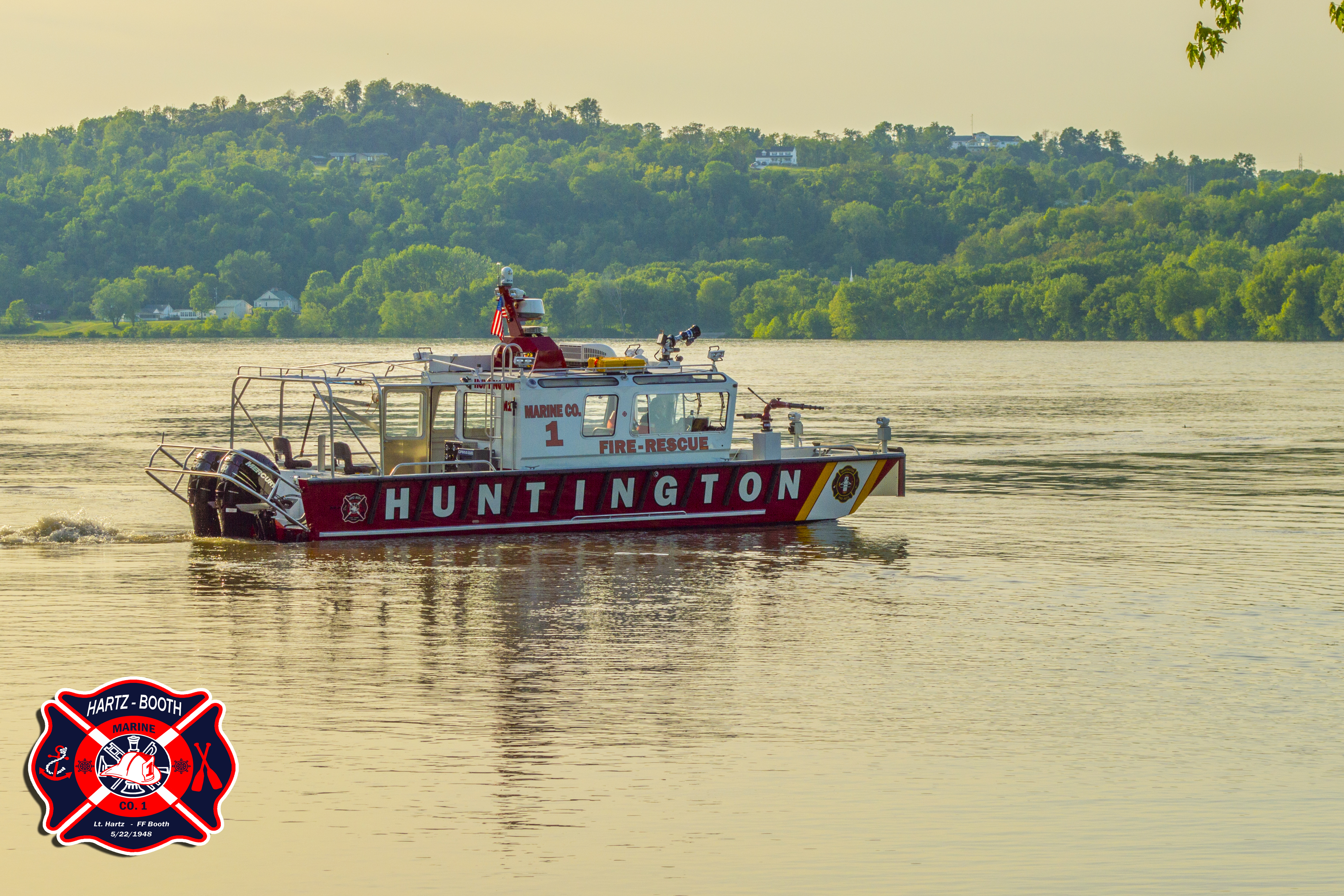
Hartz-Booth, Marine Co. 1, City of Huntington, (WV) Fire Department cruising the Ohio River at Huntington, West Virginia.

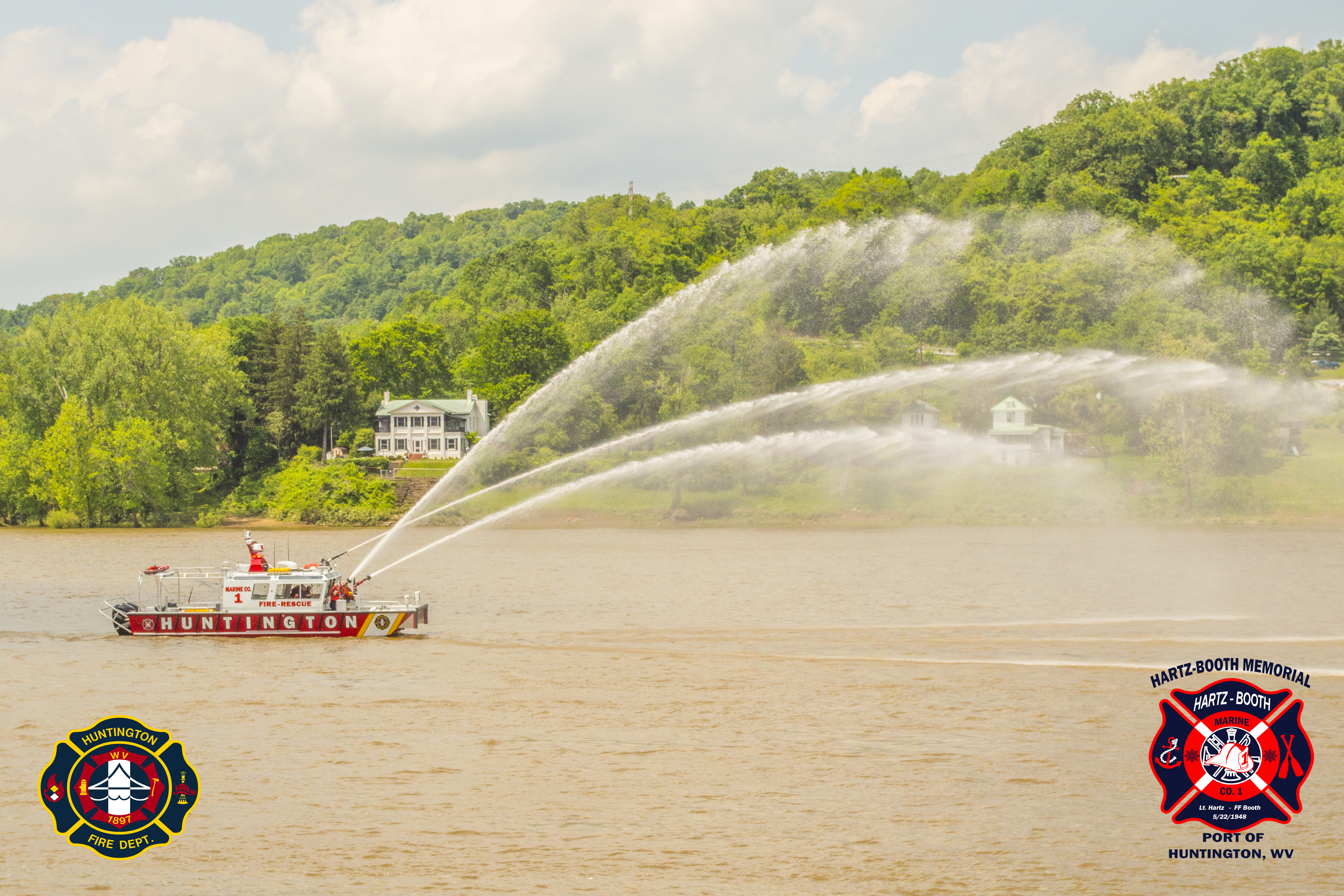
Hartz-Booth, Marine Co. 1, City of Huntington, (WV) Fire Department, flowing all three monitors on the Ohio River at Huntington, West Virginia.

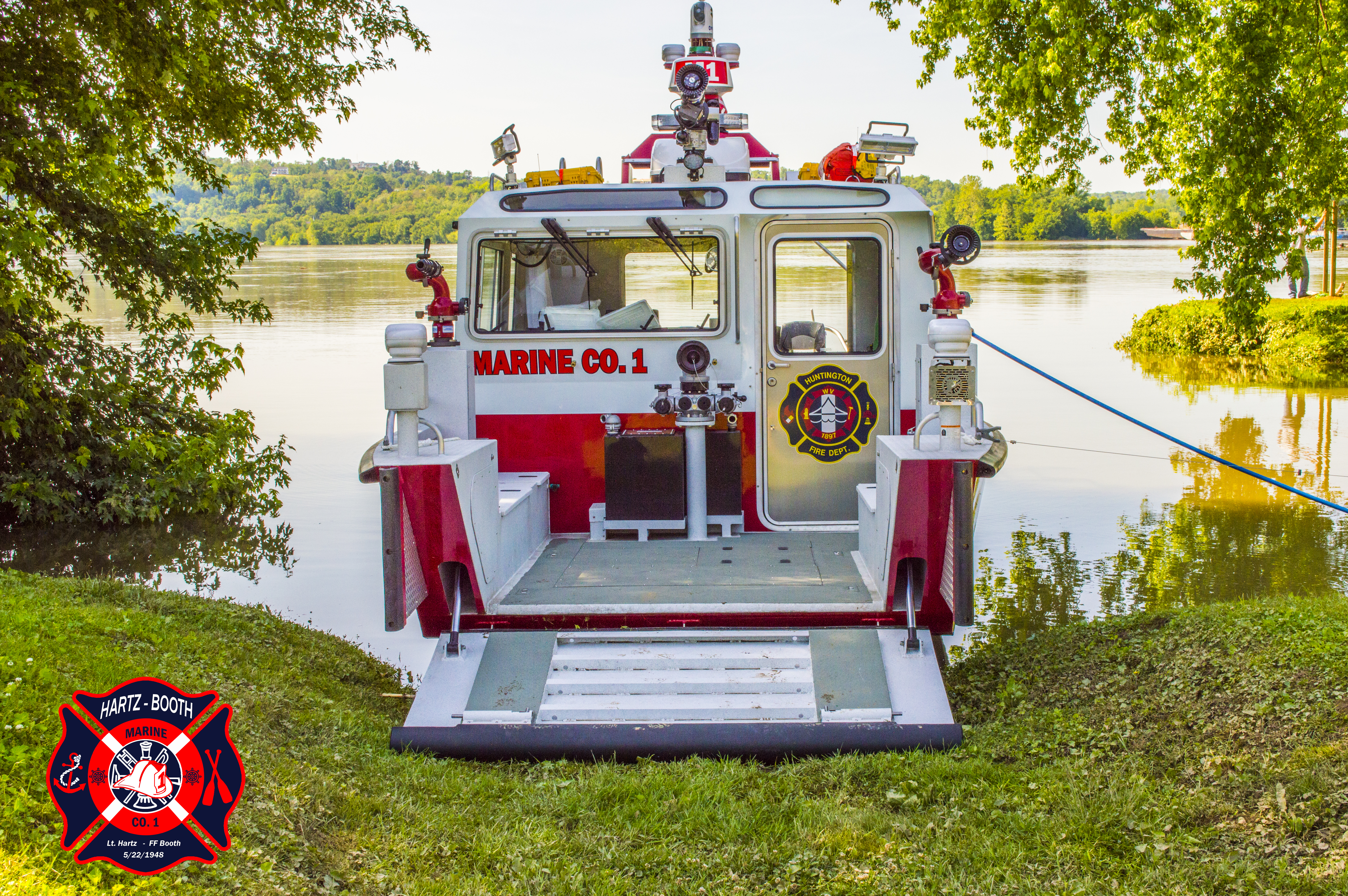
Hartz-Booth, Marine Co. 1, City of Huntington, (WV) Fire Department, bow door open, fire pump discharge outlets.

The Hartz-Booth fireboat is a thirty-six foot (11 m) boat operated by the City of Huntington, West Virginia Fire Department for emergency responses (firefighting and rescue) on the Ohio River and its tributaries in the Port of Huntington, West Virginia, United States, which is the largest inland port in the United States.

Her mission is to protect life, property and the environment in and along the Ohio River and its tributaries. She is the result of a fourteen-year project to acquire a FEMA Port Security Grant from the United States Department of Homeland Security. On September 3, 2013 the City of Huntington Fire Department was awarded $569,100.00 to purchase the boat.

The boat was primarily designed by Captain Jeff Sheets with the assistance of Lieutenant Jaymes Nelson, Lieutenant Charley Shumaker, Captain Shawn Willis, Captain Robert Ray, Private Jeff Waugh and Private Toby Mitchell. Captain Shawn Willis completed the grant application and secured the grant for the fire department.

The Hartz-Booth was dedicated and christened during a ceremony on May 22, 2014 at Harris Riverfront Park, Huntington, West Virginia and given the moniker "Marine Company 1" proclaimed by Chief Carl Eastham and Mayor Steve Williams. The Hartz-Booth is named in memory of two city firefighters, Lieutenant Leonard Hartz and Private William Ernest Booth who both drowned in the Ohio River on May 22, 1948, exactly 66 years before the dedication ceremony, attempting to rescue three young boys, John Claypool, Jr., 12 years old, brother Phillip Claypool, nine years old and Hubert James Borders, 12 years old, who went missing in the swollen and swift current around 9:30am. Both the johnboat the boys were rowing and the fire-rescue boat the two firefighters launched to rescue them capsized under a moored barge in the swift current and drowned them all. All five bodies were recovered from the Ohio River.

The boat was constructed by Lake Assault Boats of Superior, Wisconsin(4) after winning the competitive bid. The Hartz-Booth is thirty-six feet (11 m) in length and has a ten feet six inches (3.20 m) beam and is made of aluminum. She is currently docked at Adams Landing Marina in the Guyandotte section of the city and is assigned to Guyandotte Fire Station No. 5 - Engine Co. 5. The fire pump is a Hale 1,500 US gallons (5,700 L) per minute pump and flows river water through the sea chest and into the pump for firefighting water. She operates two manual monitor nozzles located on each side of the bow deck and one remote-controlled monitor located on the cabin roof. The fire pump is powered by a 6.0 liter gasoline engine and the boat is propelled by two 300 horsepower (220 kW) Mercury gasoline outboard engines.

The Hartz-Booth has an enclosed pilot house and climate-controlled patient areas, head and galley and is equipped with multi-agency, two-way radios, Forward Looking Infrared (FLIR) night vision, Lowerance GPS-enhanced RADAR and side scan sonar, American Safety Room CBRNE filter system and breathing air cascade and refill system and a power landing-craft forward bow door.3 She is the larger of two boats operated by the City of Huntington Fire Department. The other is an open-bow, Carolina Skiff, twenty-four feet (7.3 m) in length and made of fiberglass.

A second Port Security Grant Program grant was awarded to the City of Huntington to construct a floating boathouse and sub-station located on the Ohio River to house the Hartz-Booth, Marine Co. 1 and the city's police patrol boat. That project is currently in the planning stages.
