= Point Blunt Light =

Lighthouse in California, United States

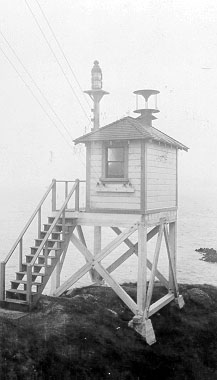
- Point Blunt Light by U.S. Coast Guard Archive
- Location: Angel Island; San Francisco Bay; California; United States
- Coordinates: 37°51′11.64″N 122°25′9.25″W

Tower
- Constructed: 1915 (first)
- Construction: concrete fog signal building
- Automated: 1976
- Height: 60 feet (18 m)
- Shape: building with light on the roof
- Markings: white building
- Operator: United States Coast Guard
- Fog signal: blast every 15 s when needed

Light
- First lit: 1956 (current)
- Focal height: 18 m (59 ft)
- Lens: order Fresnel lens
- Characteristic: Fl G 5s.

Point Blunt Light is a lighthouse on the San Francisco City and County portion of Angel Island in San Francisco Bay, California.

== History ==
Point Blunt Lighthouse was established in 1915. The lighthouse was automated in 1976.

From Coast Guard web site in 1970, before the lighthouse was automated:

Point Blunt Light was originally maintained by personnel at Angel Island Light Station at Point Knox until 1960. In 1960 a new watch room was constructed at Point Blunt which afforded a view of the entire San Francisco Bay. With the new watch room and new quarters completed in 1961 at Point Blunt, the Coast Guard moved the personnel from Angel Island Light Station.

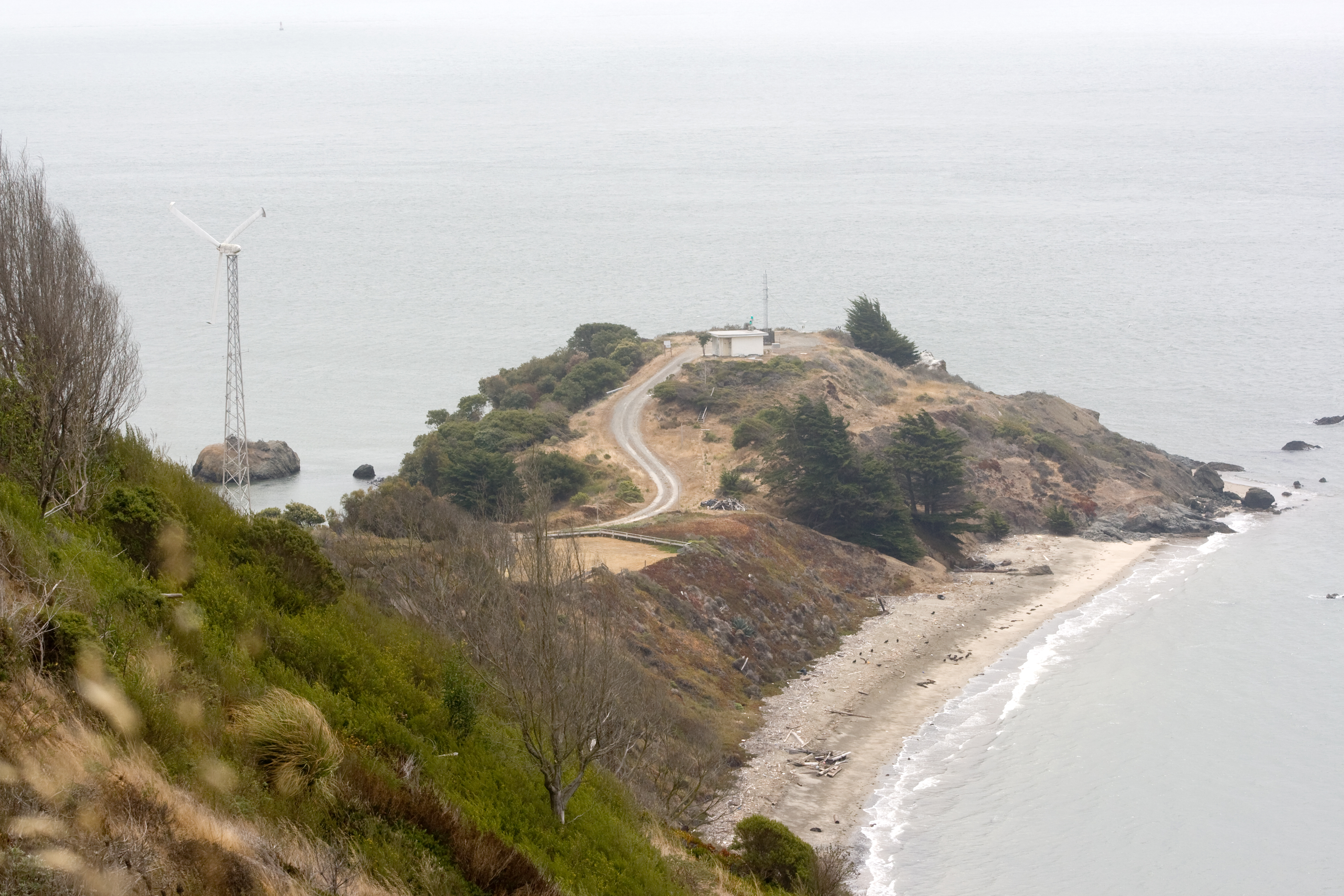
Point Blunt, July 2007

Personnel at Point Blunt operate their own light and fog signals. The station also provides special direction finder calibration services as requested. Four family units, 3 bedrooms each, are at Point Blunt. Two units are Coast Guard owned, two are leased from the State of California. One unit is occupied by the Officer in Charge and his family. The other units are presently being utilized by the married crew members and their families. One small boat is assigned to the station. A pickup truck is assigned. Point Blunt Light Station rates a BM1 as Officer in Charge, plus one EN2, one FN, and one SN.
