= Commencement (fireboat) =

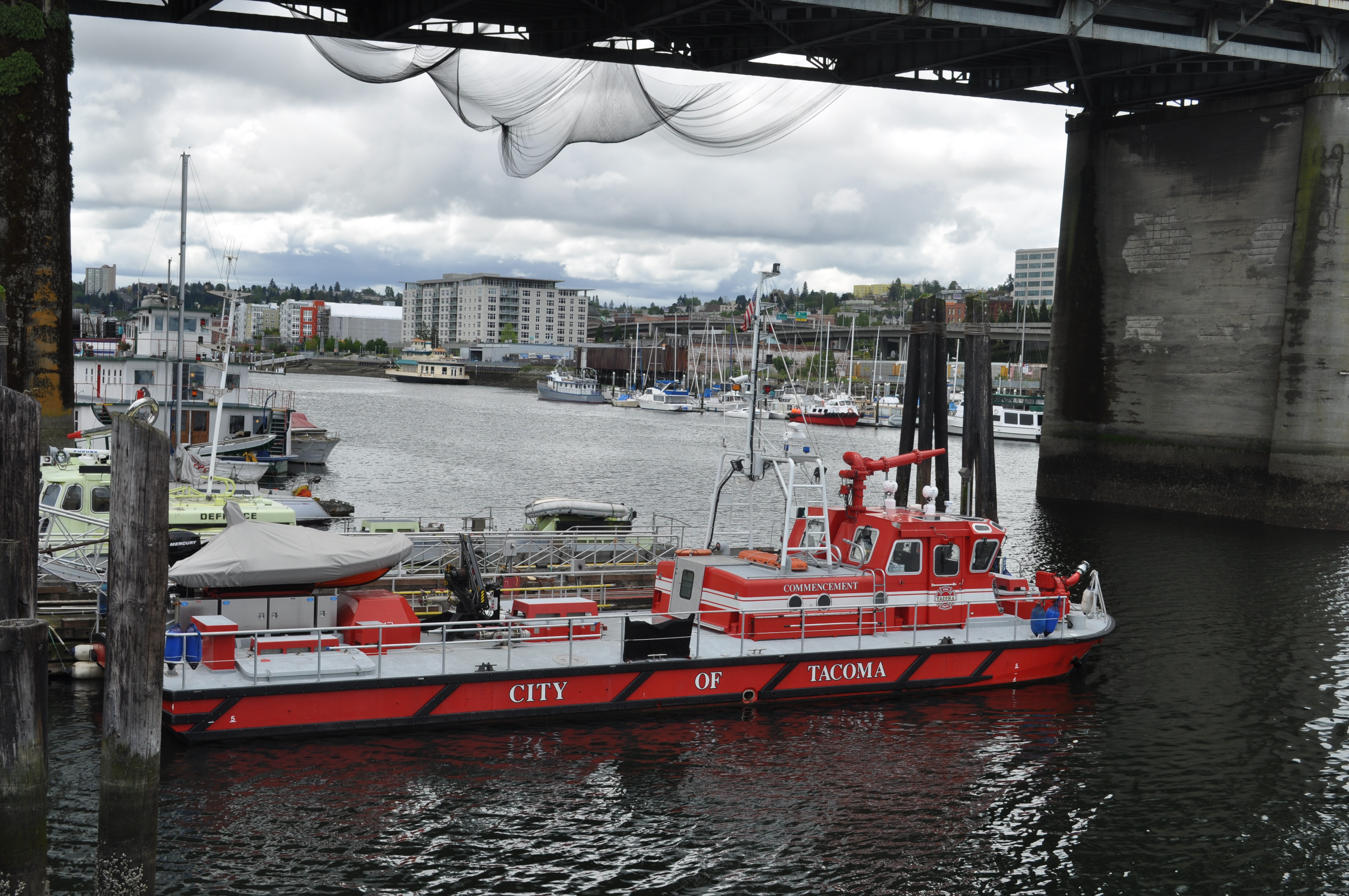
The Tacoma fireboat Commencement pictured in 2010.

M/V Commencement is a fireboat operated by the Tacoma Fire Department (TFD) in Tacoma, Washington.

Commencement is powered by two 535-horsepower engines and a 300-horsepower marine diesel engine that provides power to six 24-inch aluminum alloy fans which can be used to create an air cushion under the vessel, similar to a hovercraft. The ship has a maximum speed of 30 knots.

In 2005 Commencement was renovated and refitted with a Port security grant provided by the U.S. Department of Homeland Security.
