= Nathan Hale (fireboat) =

Emergency maritime vessel in Connecticut, United States

The Nathan Hale is an emergency vessel operated by the city of New Haven, Connecticut, United States. She serves both the New Haven Fire Department and the New Haven Police Department.

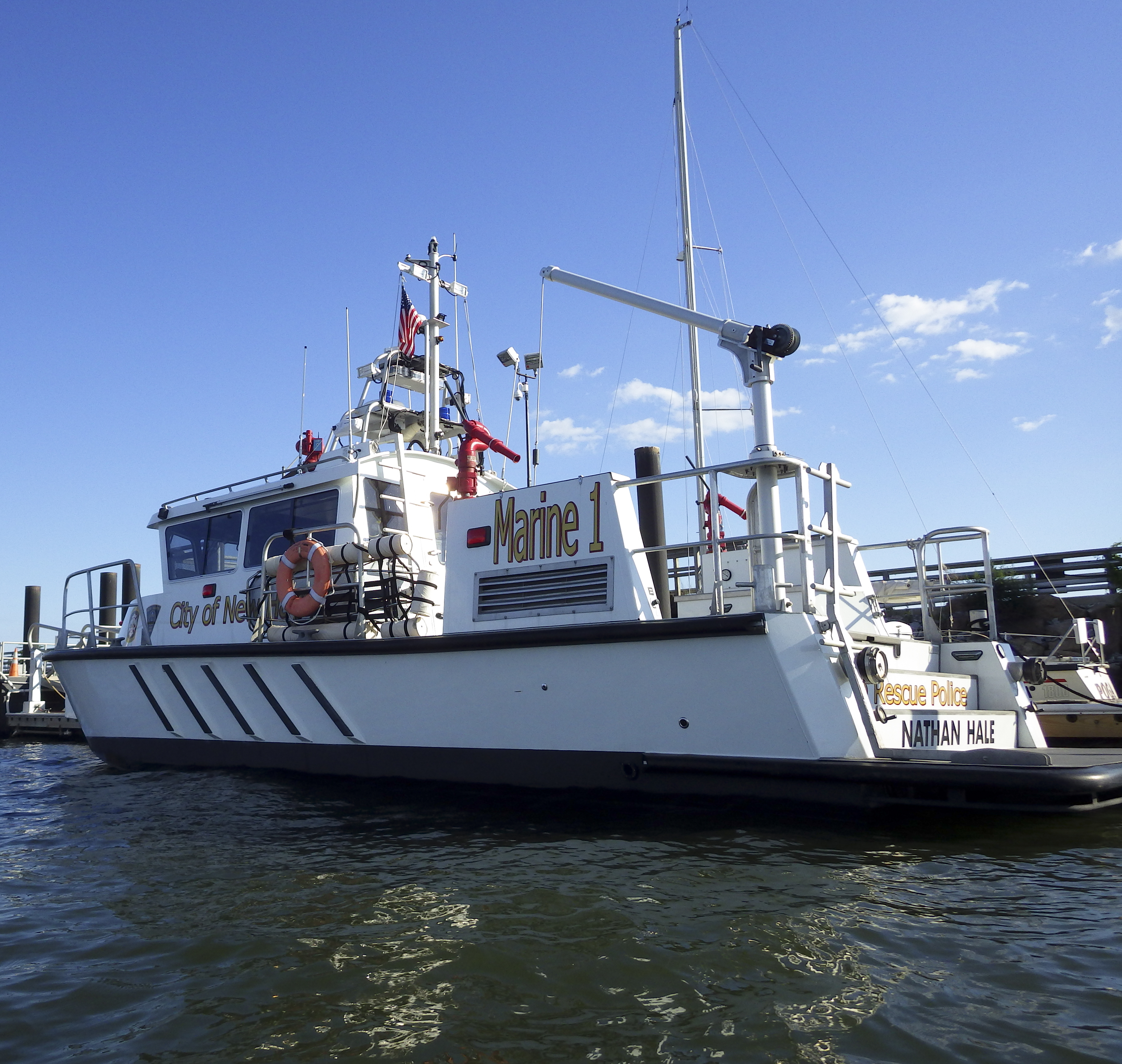
Fireboat Nathan Hale New Haven, CT

When she was launched in 2013 she was New Haven's first fireboat in 20 years. Following the attacks on September 11, 2001, the Department of Homeland Security created the Port Security Grant Fund to provide smaller ports with emergency vessels.

The Nathan Hale is a 36 foot (11 m) Metal Craft Marine Firestorm model, capable of pumping 4800 gallons per minute.
