= Robert L. Bedell =

American fireboat operated by the Norwalk Connecticut Fire Department

Robert L. Bedell is a fireboat operated by the Norwalk Connecticut Fire Department. The vessel was supplied to the city via a Department of Homeland Security grant through the Port Security Grant Fund. She was ordered in 2009 and delivered in October 2012. It is named after a longtime member of the department who died in 2004.

According to the vessel's captain, Phil D'Acunto, the purpose of DHS's Port Security Grant Fund is that by supplying local municipalities with maritime fire-fighting equipment they freed up United States Coast Guard resources for their primary role, by freeing them of a need to fight local fires. "What they're trying to do overall is take the responsibility off the Coast Guard. Since 9/11 they're trying to get the Coast Guard back to guarding the coast."

The 38 foot vessel was built in Oregon, and shipped to Norwalk by truck. She is propelled by water jets, and is capable of traveling at 35 knots. Her three water cannons can project high-velocity jets of water at a rate of 2,400 gallons per minute. Her cabin can be sealed, and kept at over-pressure, to protect the crew from smoke, toxic gas, or biological or radiological dangers. Her water cannons can be remotely aimed from within the cabin.

The vessel has a shallow draft, so she can come close to shore, if broken water mains require a local fire engine to rely on her pumps. On July 29, 2014, she participated in a training exercise with the fire department of the neighbouring municipality of Westport, where 850 feet of hose was stretched to supply water to a Westport fire engine. The Robert Bedell's pumps had no problem supplying the fire engine with enough water, as it could only project 1,500 gallons per minute.

The vessel is also equipped for search and rescue, with infrared cameras that can detect floating survivors even in poor visibility conditions. She has a platform for deploying scuba divers.

Norwalk operated a used, smaller fireboat, the Harry E. Brewer.
