= Mount Caroline Livermore =

High point of Angel Island, California

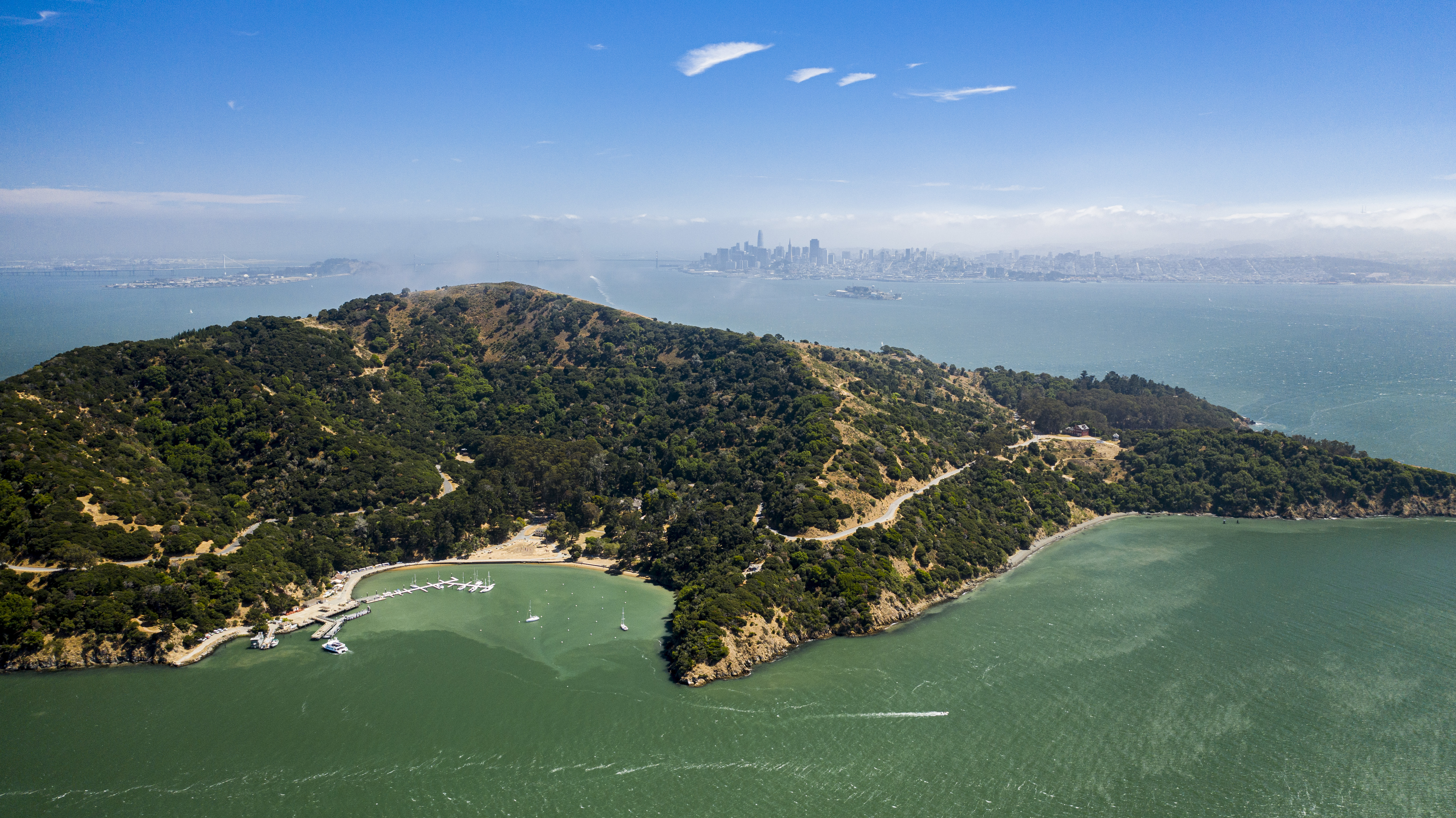
- Angel Island and the peak of Mount Caroline Livermore at center left

Highest point
- Elevation: 791 ft (241 m)
- Coordinates: 37.8614°N 122.4319°W

Geography

Mount Caroline Livermore (also known as Mount Livermore) is the high point of Angel Island, in Angel Island State Park, near the city of Tiburon in the San Francisco Bay, in the U.S. state of California. Its elevation is 791 feet (241 m).

The peak is named for American conservationist Caroline Sealy Livermore, whose work led to the protection of Angel Island and its declaration as a state park.

== Climate ==
The climate is temperate. The average temperature is 17 °C. The warmest month is August, at 24 °C, and the coldest is December, at 8 °C. The average rainfall is 550 millimetres per year. The wettest month is December, at 150 millimetres of rain, and the driest is May, at 3 millimetres.
