= Angel Island (California) =

Island in San Francisco Bay

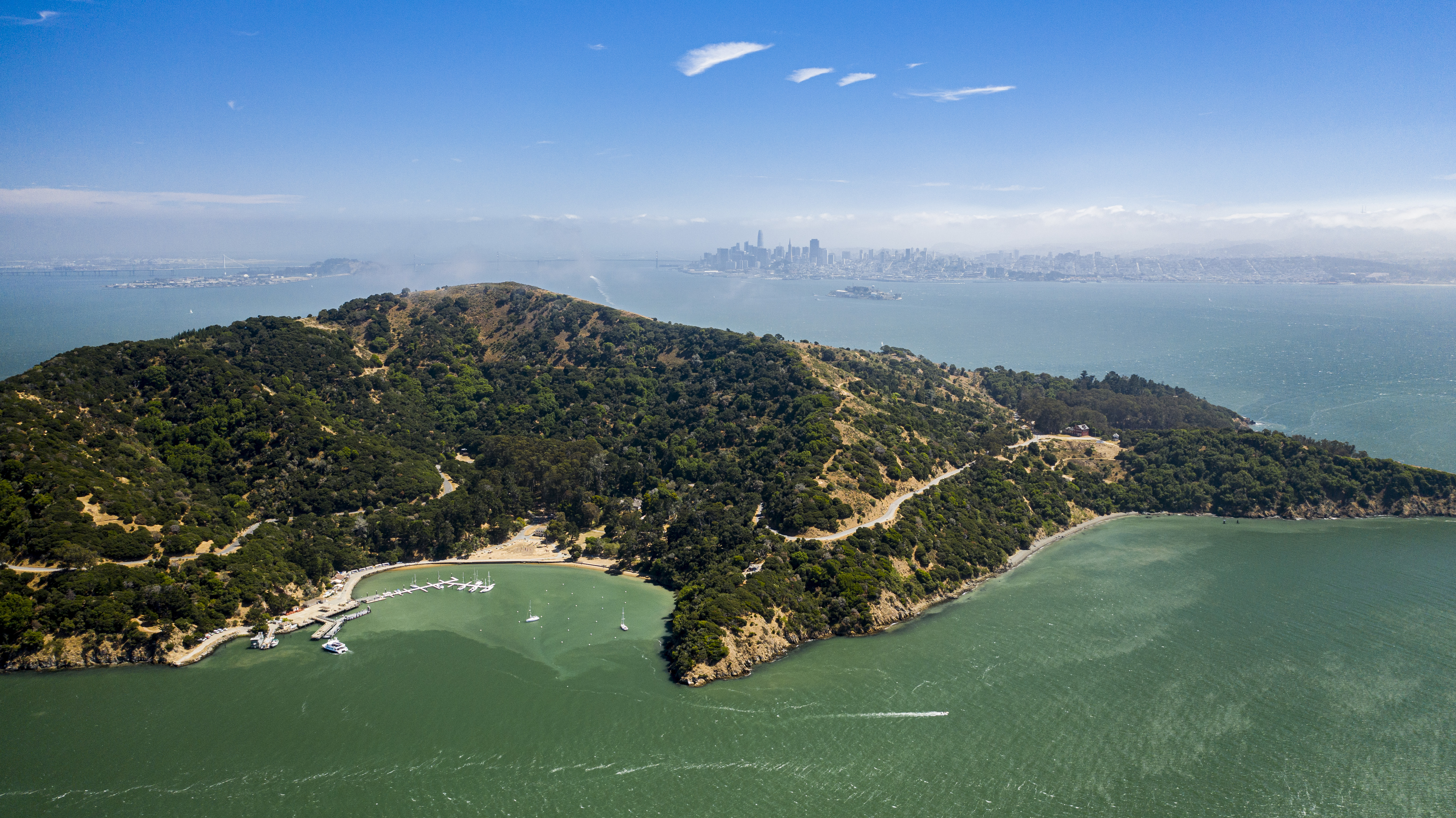
- Aerial view of Angel Island in 2019

- Location within San Francisco Bay Area Location within California Location within the United States

Geography
- Location: San Francisco Bay
- Coordinates: 37.86°N 122.43°W
- Area: 1.2 sq mi (3.1 km^{2})
- Highest elevation: 788.76 ft (240.414 m)
- Highest point: Mount Caroline Livermore

Administration
- United States
- State: California
- County: Marin County; City and County of San Francisco

Demographics
- Population: 12
- Pop. density: 3.87/km^{2} (10.02/sq mi)

U.S. National Historic Landmark District – Contributing property
- Official name: Angel Island
- Reference no.: 71000164

Angel Island (Spanish: Isla de los Ángeles) is an island in San Francisco Bay. The entire island is included within Angel Island State Park, administered by California State Parks. The island, a California Historical Landmark, has been used for a variety of purposes, including seasonal hunting and gathering by Indigenous peoples, water and timber supply for European ships, ranching by Mexicans, United States military installations, a United States Public Health Service Quarantine Station, and a U.S. Bureau of Immigration inspection and detention facility. It has been compared to Ellis Island in New York, both being centers of immigration.

The Angel Island Immigration Station, on the northeast corner of the island, which has been designated a National Historic Landmark, is where officials detained, inspected, and examined approximately one million immigrants, who primarily came from Asia.

== Geography ==
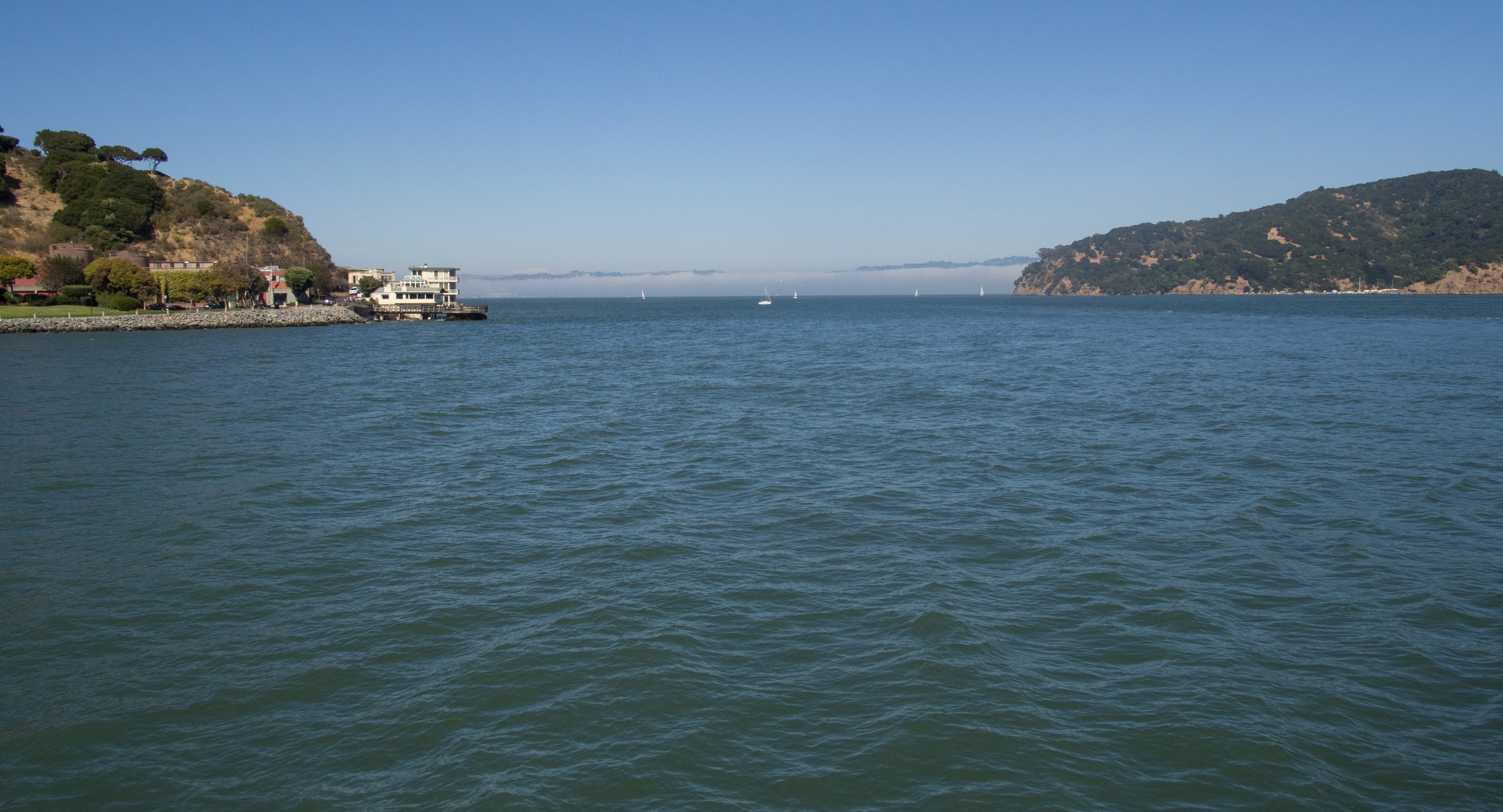
Raccoon Strait with Angel Island at right

Angel Island is the second largest island in area of the San Francisco Bay (Alameda is the largest). On a clear day, Sonoma and Napa can be seen from the north side of the island; San Jose can be seen from the south side of the island. The highest point on the island, almost exactly at its center, is Mount Caroline Livermore, more commonly known as simply Mt Livermore, at a height of 788 feet (240 meters). This peak is named for Caroline Sealy Livermore.

The island is almost entirely in the city of Tiburon, in Marin County, although there are small slivers (0.7%) at the eastern end of it (Fort McDowell, Point Blunt) which extends into the territory of the City and County of San Francisco. The island is separated from the mainland of Marin County by Raccoon Strait, the depth of the water approximately 90 feet (27 m). The United States Census Bureau reported a land area of 3.107 square miles (8.05 square kilometers) and a population of 57 people as of the 2000 census.

== Geology ==
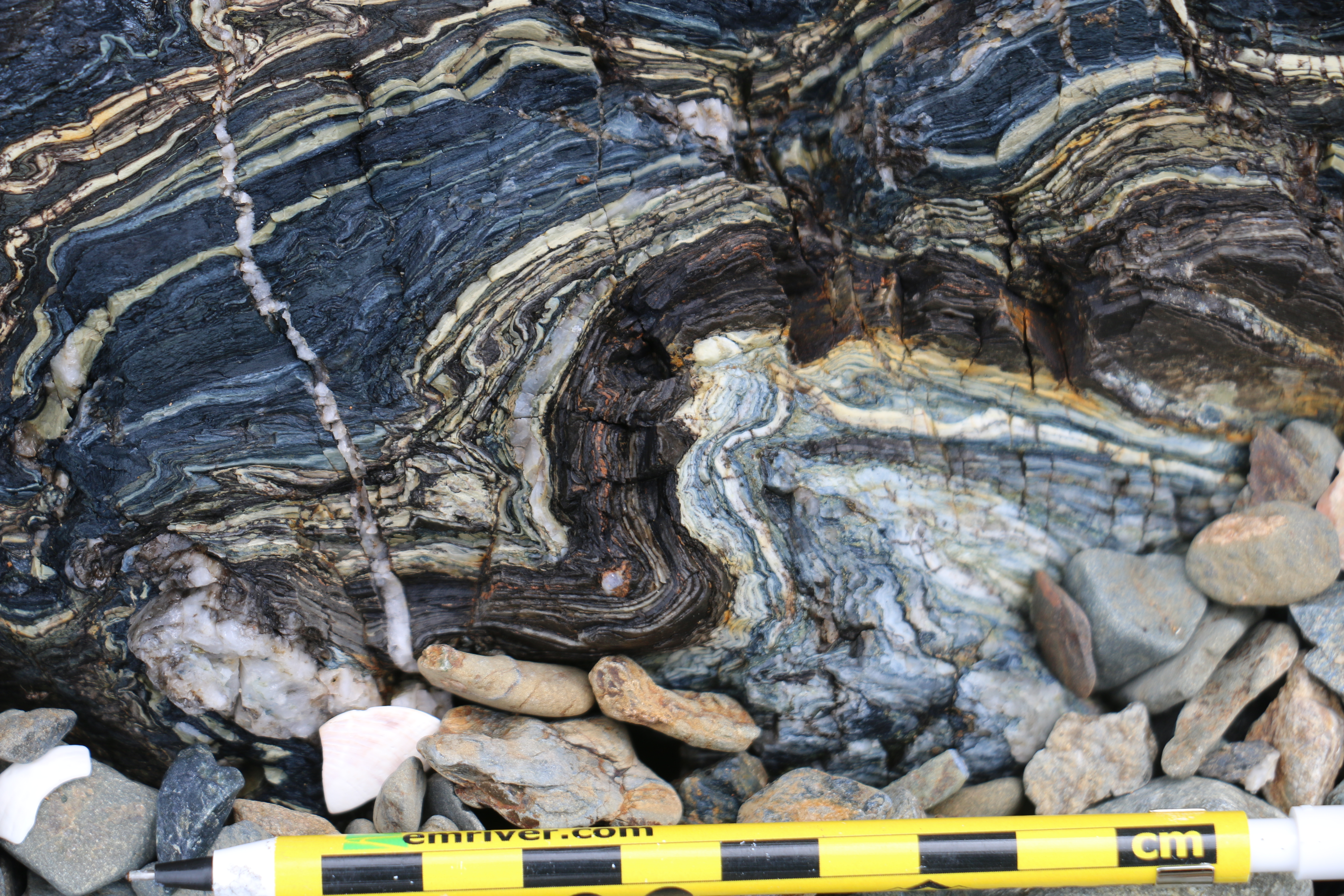
Folded glaucophane-rich metasedimentary rocks on Kayak Beach, Angel Island

Angel Island emerged during the last Ice Age when the ocean, much lower and located miles to the west, shaped the landscape. The rocks of Angel Island are part of the Franciscan Complex, an extensive belt of marine sedimentary and igneous rocks which were deformed and metamorphosed during the Mesozoic Era. Metamorphism of the Franciscan Complex occurred at high pressures and low temperatures, producing indicator minerals jadeite and glaucophane, characteristic of subduction zone metamorphism.

The rocks of Angel Island have been grouped with similar rocks displaying similar metamorphic minerals in the East Bay Hills and on the Tiburon Peninsula as the "Angel Island Nappe". The island's form is roughly, featuring steep ridges radiating from the central peak of the Mount Caroline Livermore.

The rocks are diverse, including well-exposed serpentinite in the old quarry, sandstones and conglomerates containing clasts of glaucophane schist on Kayak Beach, meta-volcanics and cherts with dark blue amphibole and brown needles of stilpnomelane on Perles Beach. However, their relationships to one another are not well understood. The Franciscan Complex rocks are unconformably overlain by flat-lying sediments of the Colma Formation near Blunt Point on the south coast of the island.

These sandstones are only weakly consolidated and are eroding to provide a supply of sand to the south coast of the island, in contrast to the northern and western beaches which are dominated by pebbles and cobbles. The shape of the hillslopes on Angel Island include the scars of prehistoric landslides and mass wasting, and deposits of eroded material may have been transported away from the island by currents in the San Francisco Bay.

== History ==
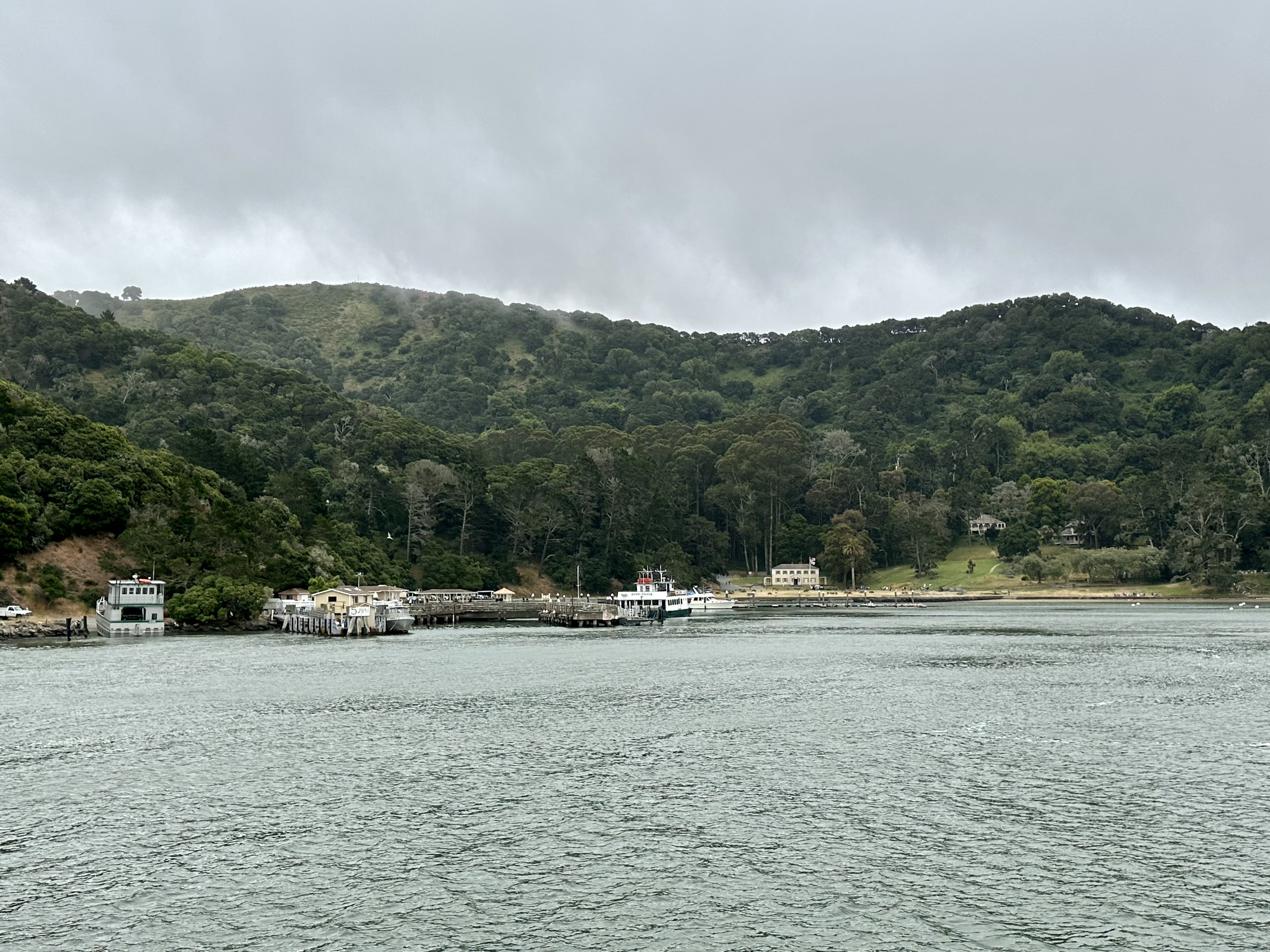
Ayala Cove, Angel Island. Juan de Ayala anchored here in 1775. The cove is the current site of the Angel Island Ferry landing.

Until about 10,000 years ago, Angel Island was connected to the mainland; it was cut off by the rise in sea levels due to the end of the last ice age. From about 2,000 years ago, the island was a fishing and hunting site for Coast Miwok Native Americans. Similar evidence of Native American settlement is found on the nearby mainland of the Tiburon Peninsula upon Ring Mountain.

In 1775, the Spanish naval vessel San Carlos made the first European entry to the San Francisco Bay under the command of Juan de Ayala. Ayala anchored off Angel Island, and gave it its modern name (Isla de los Ángeles). The bay where he anchored is now known as Ayala Cove.

In his book Two Years Before the Mast, published in 1841, Richard Henry Dana Jr. mentions in chapter 26, that in 1834 his sailing ship collected wood from "a small island, about two leagues from the Yerba Buena anchorage, called by us 'Wood Island' and by the Mexicans 'Isla de los Ángeles' and was covered with trees to the waters edge."

It is shown, labeled I. de los Angeles, on an 1850 survey map of the San Francisco Bay Area made by Cadwalader Ringgold and an 1854 map of the area by Henry Lange. Quarry operations began in the 1850s on the east side of the island near Quarry Point, with quarried stones used in the construction of a new fortress on Alcatraz Island, a new Navy shipyard on Mare Island, and a bank in San Francisco. In 1867, General McDowell took control of the quarry and used it for Army construction at Fort Point, the San Francisco Presidio, and on Angel Island itself.

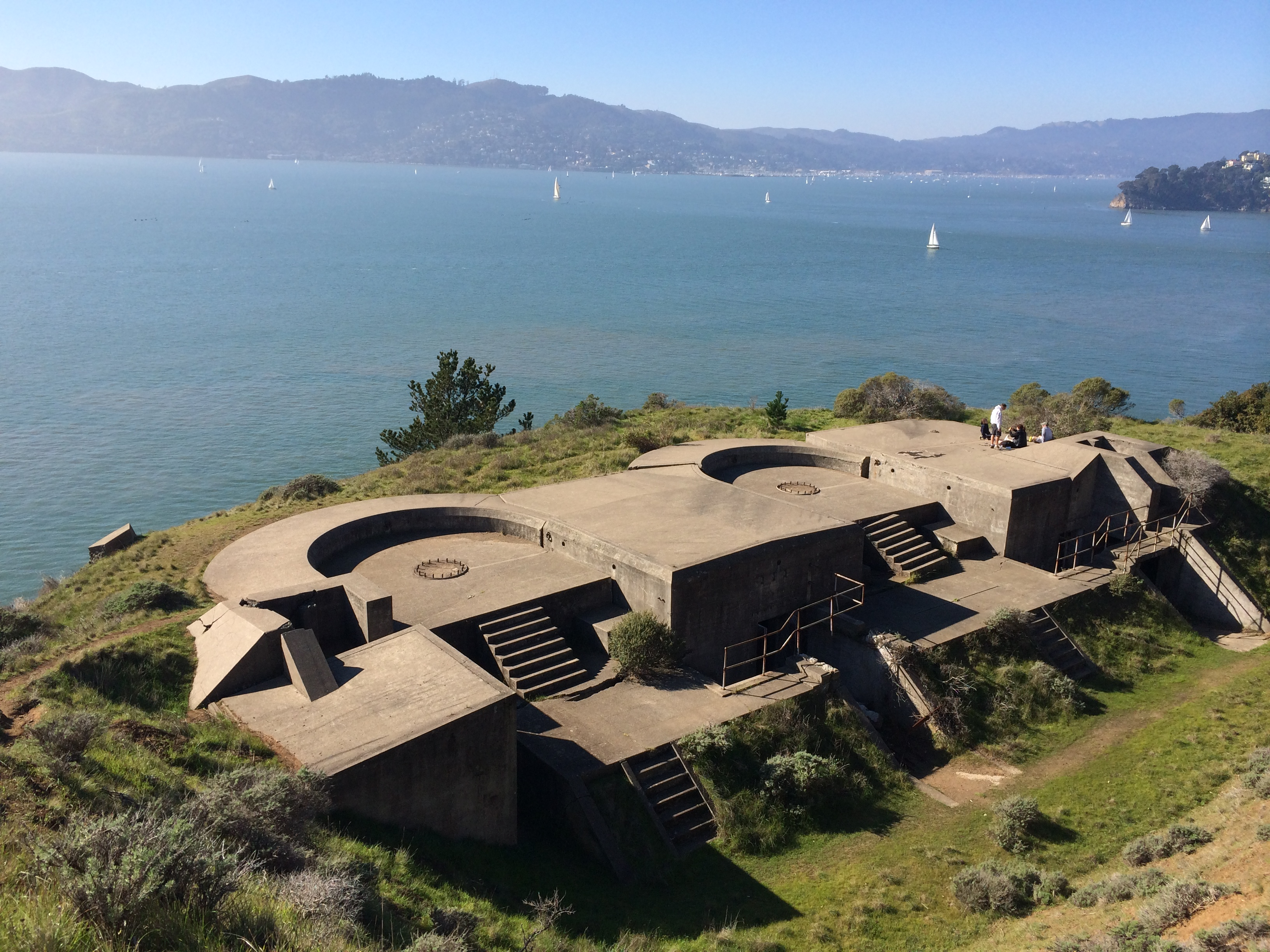
Battery Ledyard, near Point Knox, was active between 1899 and 1915.

Like much of the California coast, Angel Island was subsequently used for cattle ranching. In 1863, during the American Civil War, the U.S. Army was concerned about Confederate naval raiders attacking San Francisco. It decided to construct artillery batteries on Angel Island, first at Stuart (or Stewart) Point and then Point Knox. Col. René Edward De Russy was the Chief Engineer; James Terry Gardiner was the engineer tasked with designing and supervising the work.

The Army established Fort Reynolds, which was garrisoned by Battery B, 3rd Artillery Regiment. The post was named by Second Lieutenant John L. Tiernon, commander of Battery B, in honor of John F. Reynolds, a Union Army general who had been killed at the Battle of Gettysburg. This portion of the island is now known as Camp Reynolds or the West Garrison, and it subsequently became an infantry garrison during the US campaigns against Native American peoples in the West.

=== Fort McDowell ===
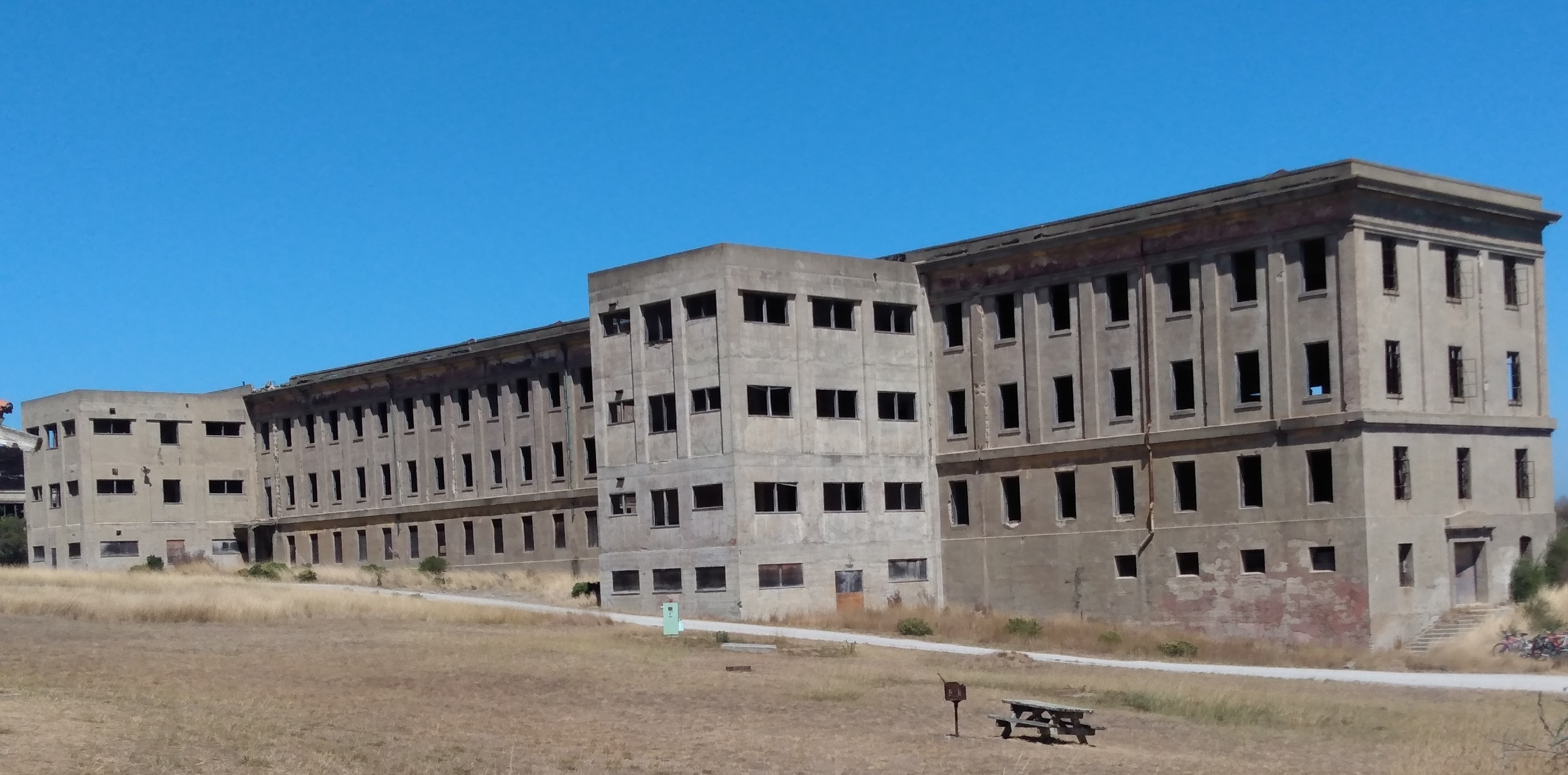
The former Fort McDowell barracks

In the later 19th century, the army designated the entire island as "Fort McDowell" and developed further facilities there, including what is now called the East Garrison or Fort McDowell. A quarantine station was opened in Ayala Cove (which at the time was known as Hospital Cove) in 1891. During the Spanish–American War the island served as a discharge depot for returning troops.

It served as a transit station in the first half of the 20th century, with troops engaged in World War I embarking and returning there. During the war, the post was commanded by Colonel George K. McGunnegle, who reached the mandatory retirement age of 64 in 1918 but remained on duty until the end of the war. After the war, the disembarkation center was commanded by William P. Burnham, who had commanded the 82nd Division in France during the war.

In May 1932, the Army created the San Francisco Port of Embarkation as a command which included the Overseas Replacement and Discharge Service at Fort McDowell, Fort Mason and the Pacific Army Transport Service ships and facilities.

In 1938, hearings concerning charges of membership in the Communist political party against labor leader Harry Bridges were held on Angel Island before Dean James Landis of Harvard Law School. After eleven weeks of testimony that filled nearly 8,500 pages, Landis found in favor of Bridges. The decision was accepted by the United States Department of Labor and Bridges was freed.

During World War II, the need for troops in the Pacific far exceeded prior needs. The facilities on Angel Island were expanded and further processing was done at Fort Mason in San Francisco. Prior to the war, the infrastructure had been expanded, including building the Army ferry USAT General Frank M. Coxe, which transported troops to and from Angel Island on a regular schedule.

Part of North Garrison of Fort McDowell functioned as a Prisoner of War Processing Center for Japanese and German prisoners of war.

Fort McDowell was used as a detention station for Japanese immigrant residents of Hawaii (one percent of the ethnic Japanese population in Hawaii) arrested as potential fifth columnists (despite a lack of supporting evidence or access to due process), German and Italian. These internees were later transferred to inland Department of Justice and Army camps. Japanese and German prisoners of war were also held on the island, supplanting immigration needs, which were curtailed during the war years.

After World War II ended, the reorganization of the San Francisco Port of Embarkation did not include Fort McDowell, and the post was decommissioned on August 28, 1946.

In 1954 a Nike missile station was installed on the island. The missile magazines were constructed above Point Blunt on the island's southeast corner, and the top of Mount Ida (now Mount Caroline Livermore) was flattened to make way for a helipad and the associated radar and tracking station (IFC). The missiles were removed in 1962, when the military left the island. The missile launch pad still exists, but the station atop Mount Caroline Livermore was restored to its original contours in 2006.

=== Quarantine station ===
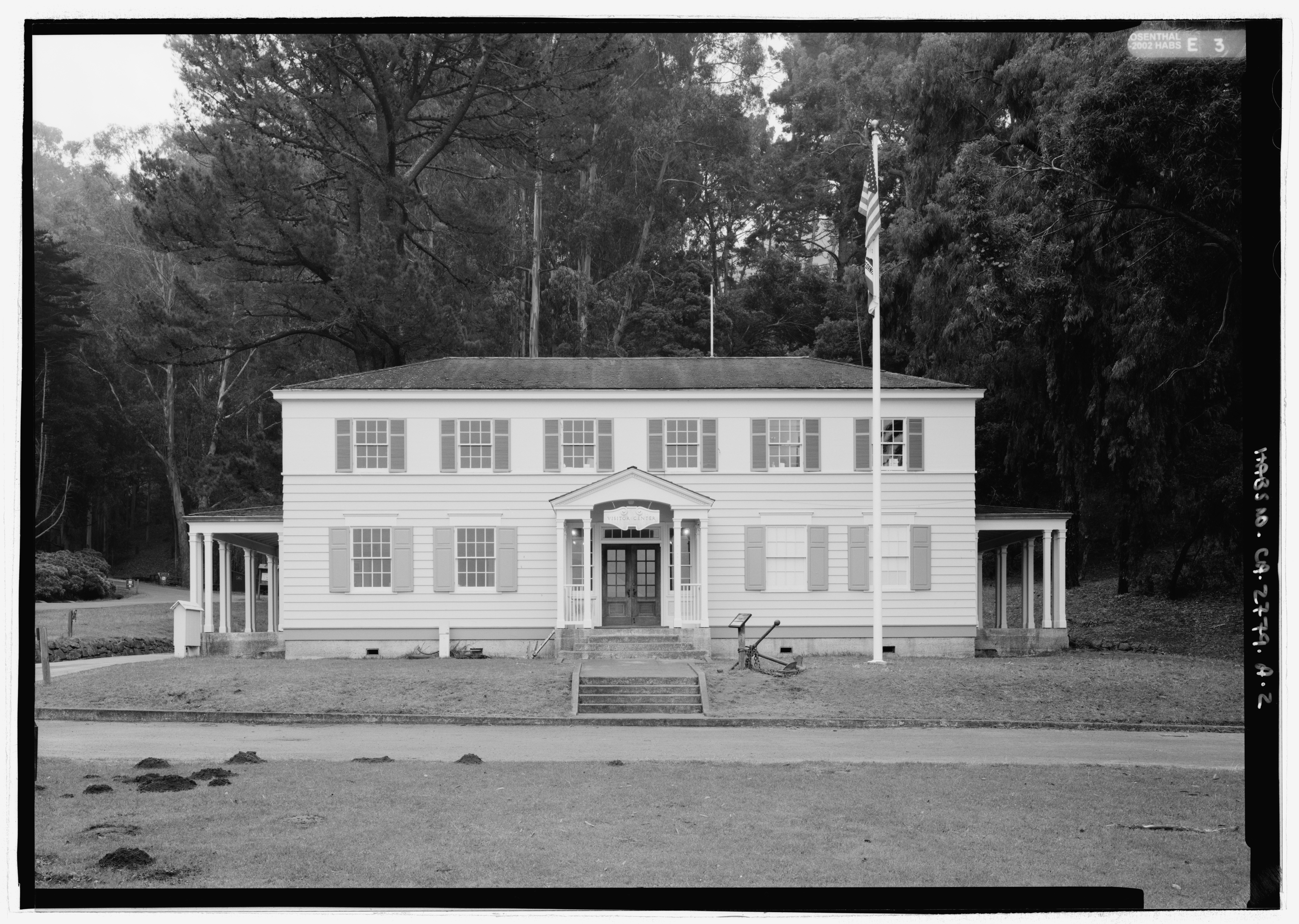
Quarantine Station, Officers' Quarters, Angel Island State Park

The bubonic plague posed such a threat to the U.S. that Angel Island opened as a quarantine station in 1891 to screen Asian passengers and their baggage prior to landing on U.S. soil. The construction of this federally funded quarantine station was completed in 1890 at a cost of approximately $99,000. The compound contained many separate buildings including detention barracks, disinfection facilities, convalescence quarters, and an isolation hospital that was known as the "leper's house". Even with the new construction, the facilities were lacking in cleanliness, staffing and adequate space.

In response to the death of Wong Chut King, a Chinese immigrant who worked in a rat-infested lumberyard in Chinatown, the San Francisco Health Board quickly quarantined the local area to neutralize possible disease-causing agents. Persons suspected of having any contact with this sickness were sent to isolation facilities. After more deaths, tissue samples were sent to Angel Island for testing to determine if they harbored Yersinia pestis, the bacteria responsible for spreading the bubonic plague.

At this time, the plague was difficult to diagnose due to other diseases which could mask the presence of plague. The culture was tested on animals for four days, and Y. pestis was confirmed. Bacteriologist Joseph J. Kinyoun, who was stationed at Angel Island in 1899, believed that the plague would spread throughout San Francisco's Chinatown.

=== Immigration station ===
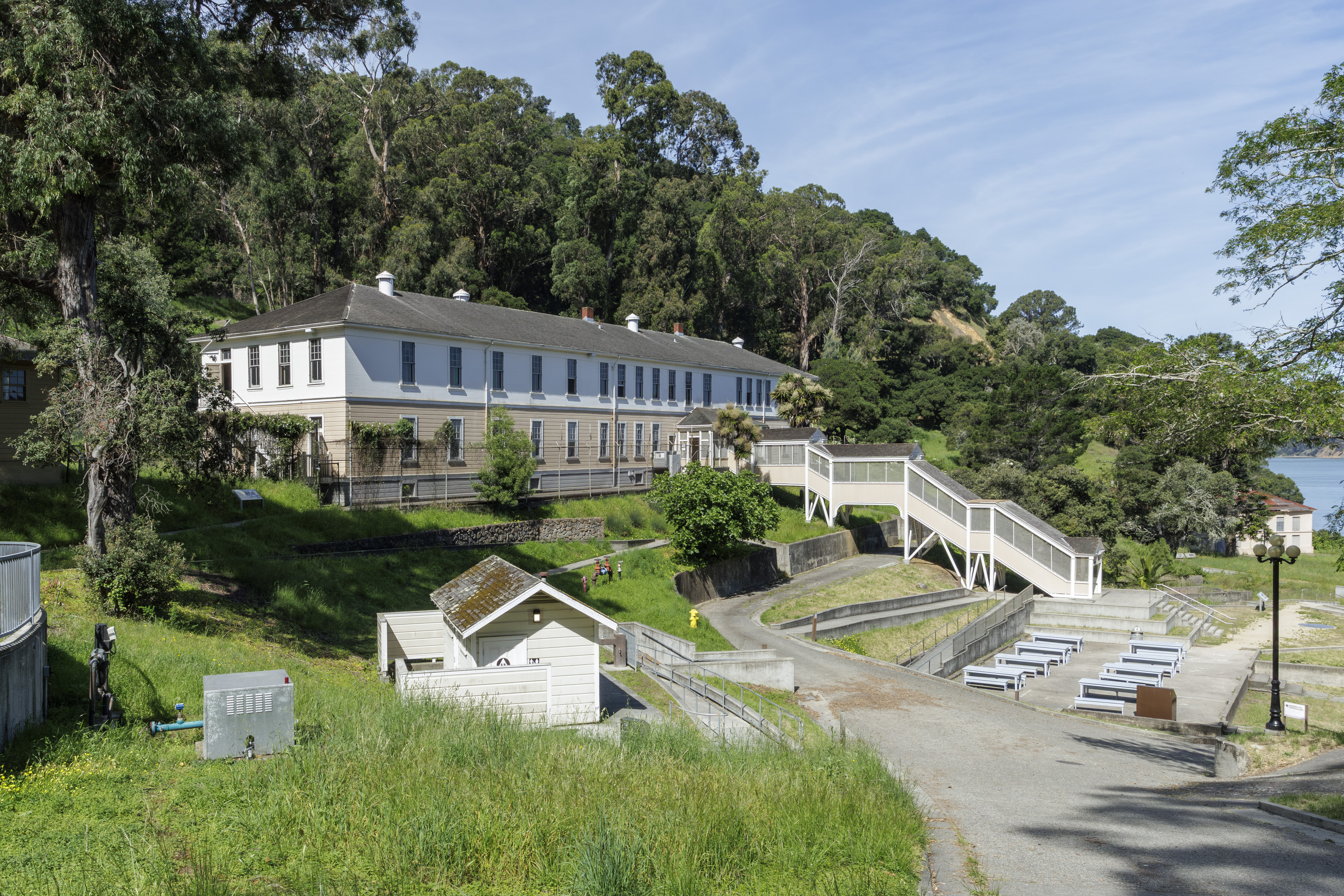
Angel Island detention barracks

The construction of the Angel Island immigration station began in 1905 but was not used until 1910. This zone was known as China Cove. It was built for controlling Chinese entry into the United States. From 1910 to 1940, Angel Island served as an immigration station processing immigrants from 84 countries, mostly from China, Japan, Russia and South Asia (in that order). The purpose of the immigration station was to investigate Chinese who had been denied entry from the Chinese Exclusion Act of 1882. Immigrants had to prove that they had husbands or fathers who were U.S. citizens in order not to be deported.

The immigration station at Angel Island was predominantly used to inspect, disinfect, and detain Chinese, Japanese, and other Asian immigrants who sailed across the Pacific Ocean. In addition to standard medical examinations, Chinese immigrants were inspected for parasitic diseases, and the tests for intestinal parasites required a stool specimen. Immigrants described the examination and disinfection process as brutal, humiliating, and indecent.

Passengers who were found to be sick were sent to the hospital in the immigration station until they could pass a medical examination and an immigration hearing. Investigation processes determined the length of time an immigrant would stay at the station and Chinese immigrants could be detained for a period as short as two weeks to as long as two years. A person's racial identity and social class determined the intensity of the examination imposed, resulting in fewer white Europeans and American citizens being subjected to the inspections.

A fire destroyed the administration building in 1940, and subsequent immigration processing took place in San Francisco. On November fifth of 1940, the last gathering of around 200 immigrants, including around 150 Chinese, were exchanged from Angel Island to brief quarters in San Francisco.

In 1964, the Chinese American community successfully lobbied the State of California to designate the immigration station as a State Landmark. Today, the Angel Island Immigration Station is a federally designated National Historic Landmark. The detention barrack was renovated by the California State Parks, which reopened February 16, 2009. Docent tours for school groups can be made by appointment. After sitting vacant since World War II, the hospital near the detention barrack was renovated, at a cost of $15 million from a variety of federal, state and private sources, and opened as a museum in 2022.

== Angel Island State Park ==
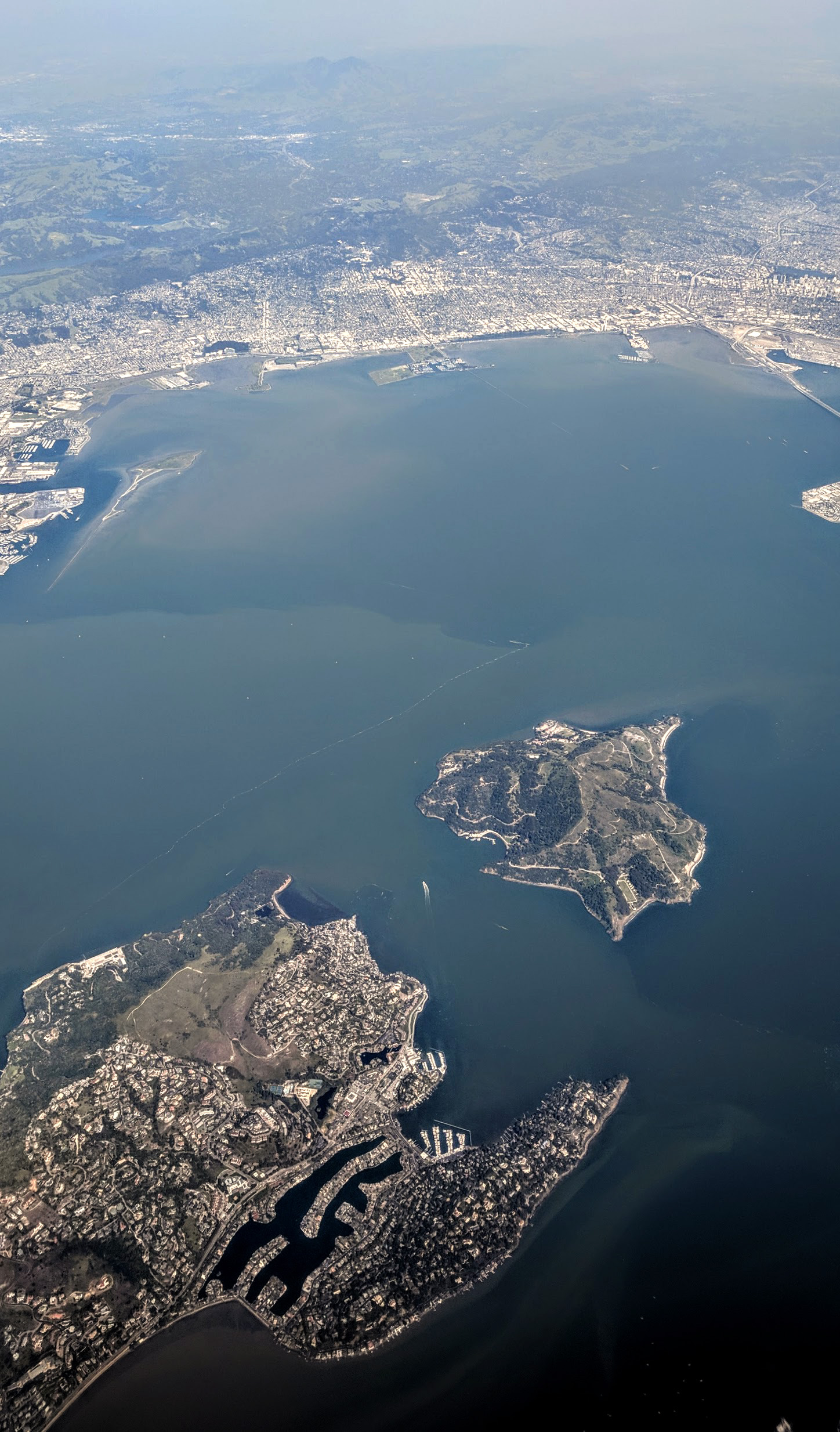
An aerial view of Angel Island (center), near the Tiburon Peninsula (California) (lower left), including Belvedere, with Richmond, Albany, Berkeley, Emeryville (left to right at top) in the background

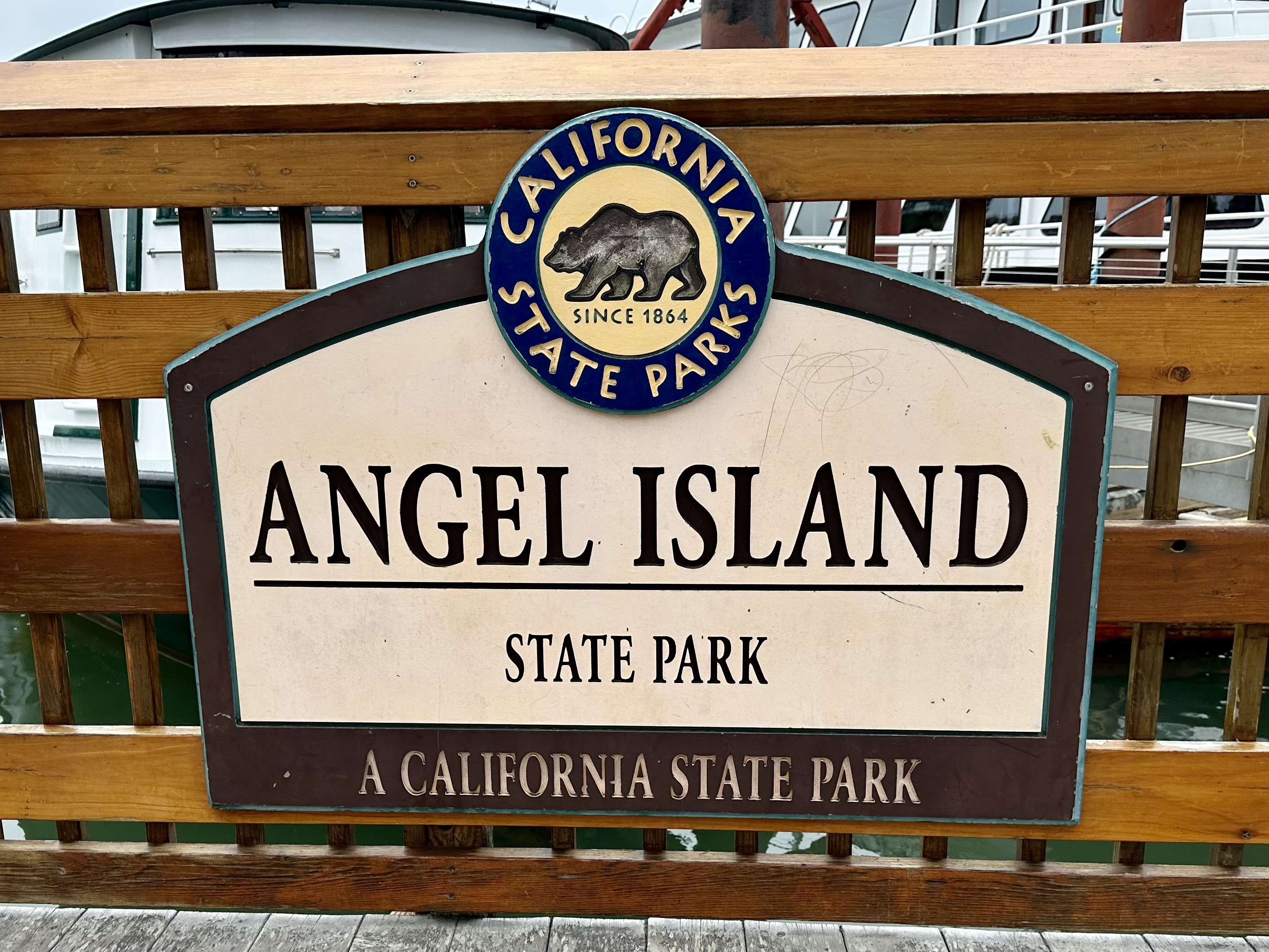
Angel Island State Park

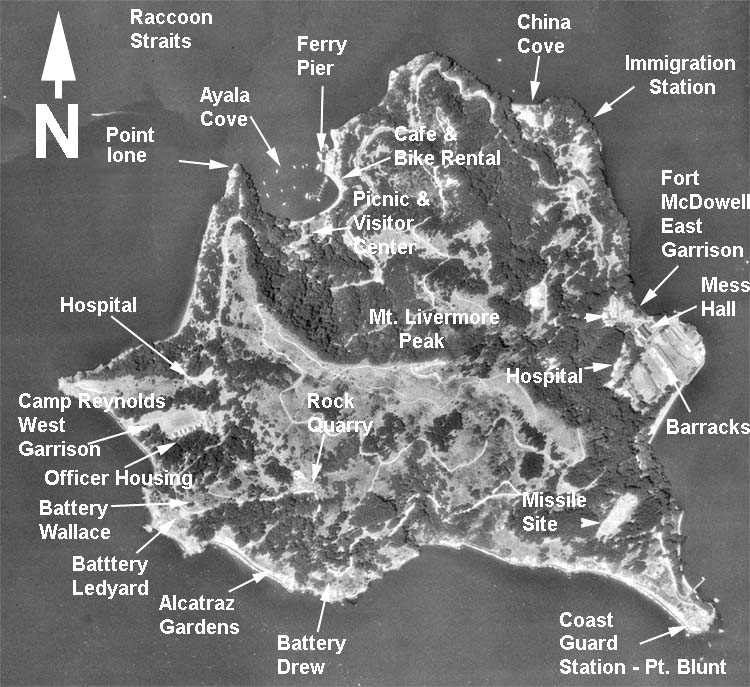
Angel island features

In 1955, the State Park Commission authorized California State Parks to purchase 38 acres (15 ha) around Ayala Cove, marking the birth of Angel Island State Park. Additional acreage was purchased four years later, in 1959. The last federal Department of Defense personnel withdrew in 1962, turning over the entire island as a state park in December of the same year.

There is one active United States Coast Guard lighthouse on the island at Point Blunt. The lighthouse at Point Stuart has been disestablished.

=== Ecology ===
The island's native plant communities include coastal grassland and coastal scrub, mostly on the island's south- and west-facing slopes and ridge tops, and evergreen woodland – predominantly of coast live oak (Quercus agrifolia), bay (Umbellularia californica), toyon (Heteromeles arbutifolia), and madrone (Arbutus menziesii), with California hazelnut (Corylus cornuta) and western sword fern (Polystichum munitum) in the understory – on the eastern and northern portions of the island sheltered from the westerly winds from the Golden Gate.

It is thought that the Coast Miwoks used regular fires to expand the grassland and shrublands at the expense of the woodlands. Commodities from continents worldwide have seamlessly merged into the environment through livestock transportation and Spanish missionaries' seed cultivation. The grasslands and shrublands provided edible seeds and bulbs, and supported larger numbers of deer and small game.

The Angel Island mole, Scapanus latimanus insularis, is a subspecies of broad-footed mole endemic to Angel Island.

The military had planted 24 acres of bluegum eucalyptus (Eucalyptus globulus) on the island for windbreaks, beautification, timber, and erosion control. By the mid-1980s, the area covered by eucalyptus had expanded to 86 acres. In the 1980s, California State Parks undertook environmental studies to remove most of the eucalyptus from the island, in order to restore native flora and reduce fire danger. The proposal generated controversy and received much local media coverage, and was approved to begin in 1990. Eucalyptus were removed from 80 acres between 1990 and 1997, and nursery-grown native plants were planted in the cleared areas. Six acres of historically significant eucalyptus trees were retained.

As elsewhere in California, intensive cattle grazing in the 19th century allowed annual grasses introduced from Southern Europe to replace the native perennial grasses. Before European colonization, the Angel Island area maintained a diverse oak woodland ecosystem consisting of coast live oak, California bay, and madrone. Additionally, grasslands and coastal scrub primarily covered shrubbery in the South and West portions. Ongoing removal of non-native plants, including French broom (Genista monspessulana), Italian thistle (Carduus pycnocephalus) and ice plant (Carpobrotus edulis), continues in an effort to restore the original evergreen woodland, perennial grassland, and coastal scrub plant communities.

In addition to the eucalyptus, plantings from the military period of Monterey pine (Pinus radiata), cork oak (Quercus suber), Australian blackwood (Acacia melanoxylon), Canary Island date palm (Phoenix canariensis), century plant (Agave americana), Japanese redwood (Cryptomeria japonica), incense cedar (Calocedrus decurrens), Deodar cedar (Cedrus deodara), coast redwood (Sequoia sempervirens), giant sequoia (Sequoiadendron giganteum), Norfolk Island pine (Araucaria heterophylla), monkey puzzle tree (Araucaria araucana) and others can be found in and around the former military bases and immigration station.

Mule deer (Odocoileus hemionus) were reintroduced to the island by the army in 1915 for hunting. In the absence of predators, the deer population expanded and overgrazed the island. The deer population is now managed annually by California State Parks and the Department of Fish and Game.

In 2002, the summit of Mount Caroline Livermore, which had been flattened in the 1950s to build the Nike missile radar and tracking installation, was re-contoured to resemble its original appearance, and increased 16 feet in height as a result. The access road up the west side of the mountain was removed, and replaced with a winding trail up the east side.

==== 2008 fire ====
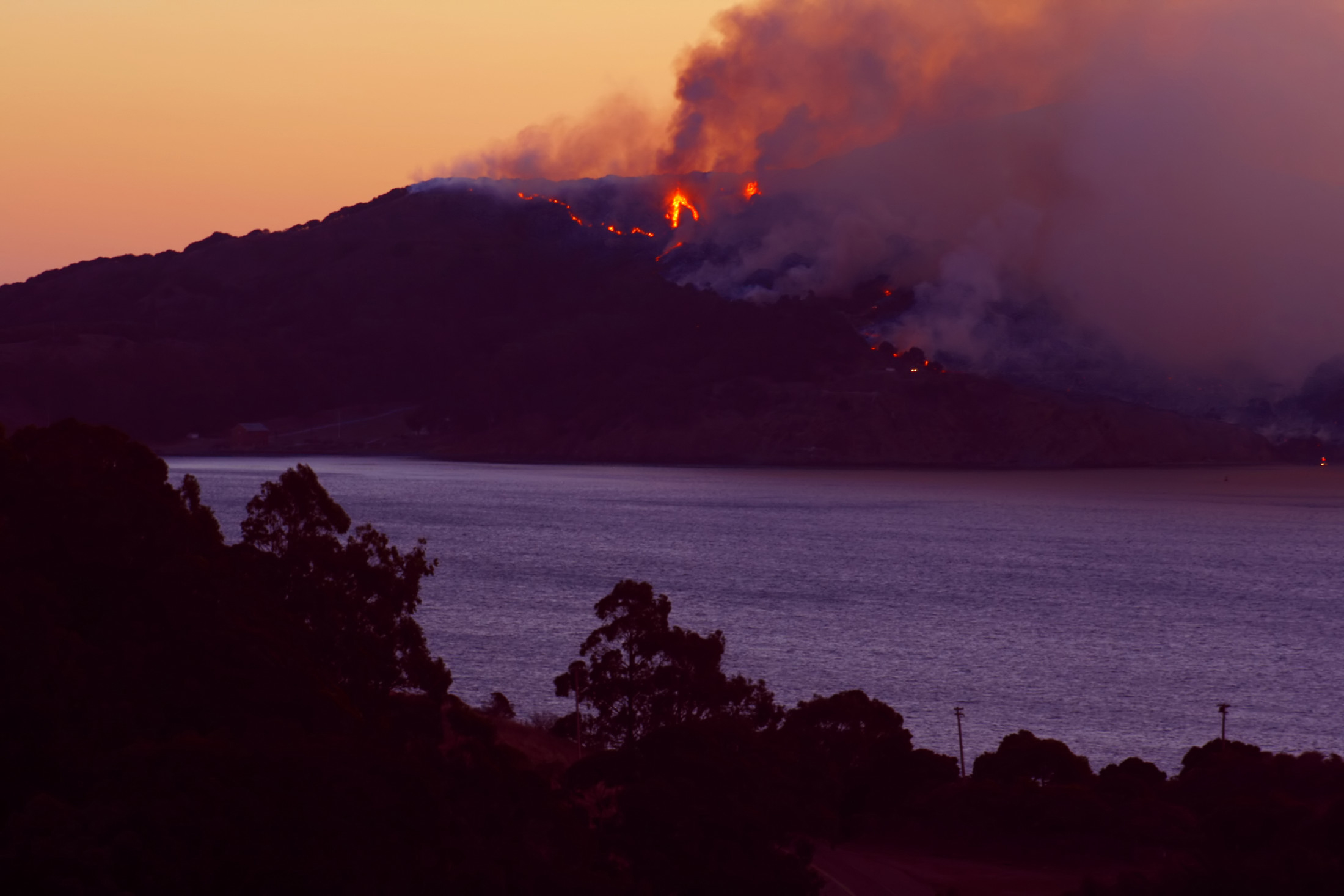
The fire on October 13, 2008

On October 12, 2008, at approximately 9 p.m. PDT, a fire visible from all around the San Francisco Bay broke out on the island and spread to an estimated 100 acres (40 ha) within an hour. By 8 a.m. the next morning, the fire had scorched 250 acres (100 ha) – a third of the island – and was 20 percent contained.

Firefighters ran around from the mainland and helicopters dropped water and fire retardants to protect the historical buildings and extinguish the fire that was fully contained by October 14, 2008, at approximately 7 p.m. 380 of the island's 740 acres (300 ha) were burned in the fire. With the exception of one abandoned water tank, no structures were lost in the fire.

Firefighting efforts were coordinated from the USCGC Sockeye.

In portions of the evergreen woodlands, the fire burned through quickly, consuming the understory, but leaving the trees mostly undamaged. The fire burned several stands of Monterey pine (Pinus radiata) originally planted by the U.S. Army, which will be restored to native evergreen woodlands.

Prior fires include one in 2005 that burned 25 acres (10 ha), and a smaller 2–3-acre blaze in 2004.

=== Access ===
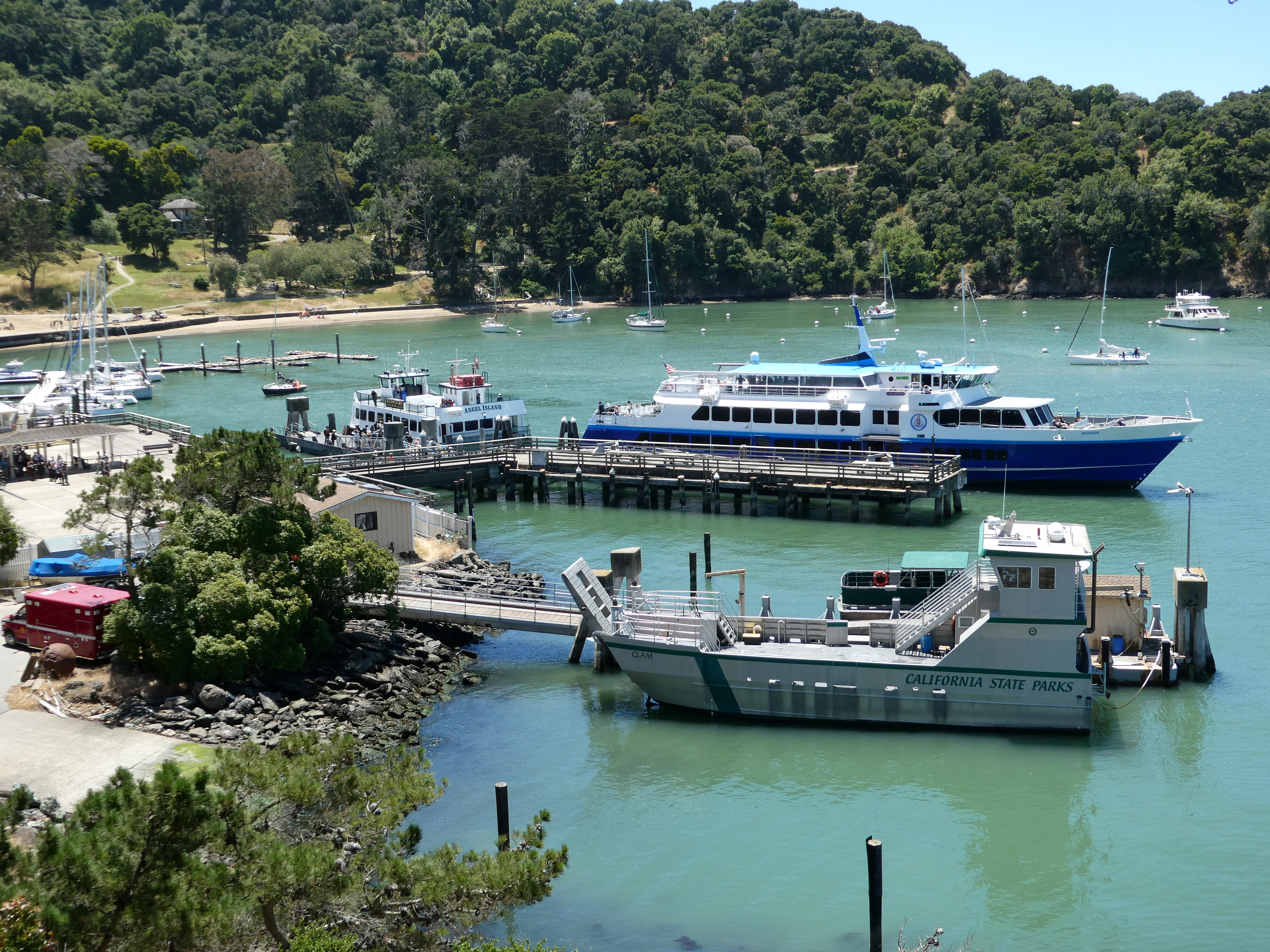
Ayala Cove Ferry Terminal

Access to the island is only by boat at Ayala Cove Ferry Terminal. There is ferry service to the island from San Francisco or from Tiburon. The Angel Island-Tiburon Ferry operates daily from Tiburon to the island. Golden Gate Ferry operates ferries to the San Francisco Ferry Building. During the off-season (October–March), all ferries run a reduced schedule. All ferry fares include park admission. Private boats can also access the island. The California State Park Annual Day Use Pass can be used to pay day use dock fees for private boats, but it is not accepted from visitors coming via the public ferries.

Bicycles can be brought on the ferry or rented seasonally on land and used on the island's main roads. Electric scooters and Segways used to be able to be rented; however, these are no longer available for rental. Due to the terrain, roller skates, roller blades, skateboards, kick scooters, and personal Segway scooters are prohibited.

Dogs (except service dogs) are not allowed.

Wood fires are prohibited. Charcoal fires are allowed, but charcoal is not available for purchase on the island.

There are 11 environmental campsites, including an ADA site, 9 numbered sites (each site accommodating up to 8 people), and a kayak-accessible group site (holds up to 20 people).

Night travel on the island is prohibited in some areas for reasons of park security and public safety.

Metal detectors, while allowed, are not recommended, because digging or disturbing the soil or ground in the park is prohibited.

=== Electrical infrastructure ===
Angel Island is served by PG&E via two 12 kV undersea cables which cross Raccoon Strait from Tiburon. As of mid-2015, peak electrical load is approximately 100 kW. One cable is out of service and the other is deteriorating. Instead of replacing the cables, PG&E is investigating using the island for a distributed energy resources microgrid pilot project.

== See also ==
- Islands of San Francisco Bay
- List of California state parks
