= Department of Homeland Security Port Security Grant =

Funding grant program for fireboats

Since 2002, the Department of Homeland Security has provided Port Security Grants to ports within the United States, to build fireboats. In addition to carrying firefighting equipment, these vessels are equipped to help counter nuclear fallout, chemical weapons and biological weapons.

The grants are made under the Maritime Transportation Security Act of 2002. The Federal Emergency Management Agency, one of the agencies under DHS, provided $100 million worth of grants in 2015.

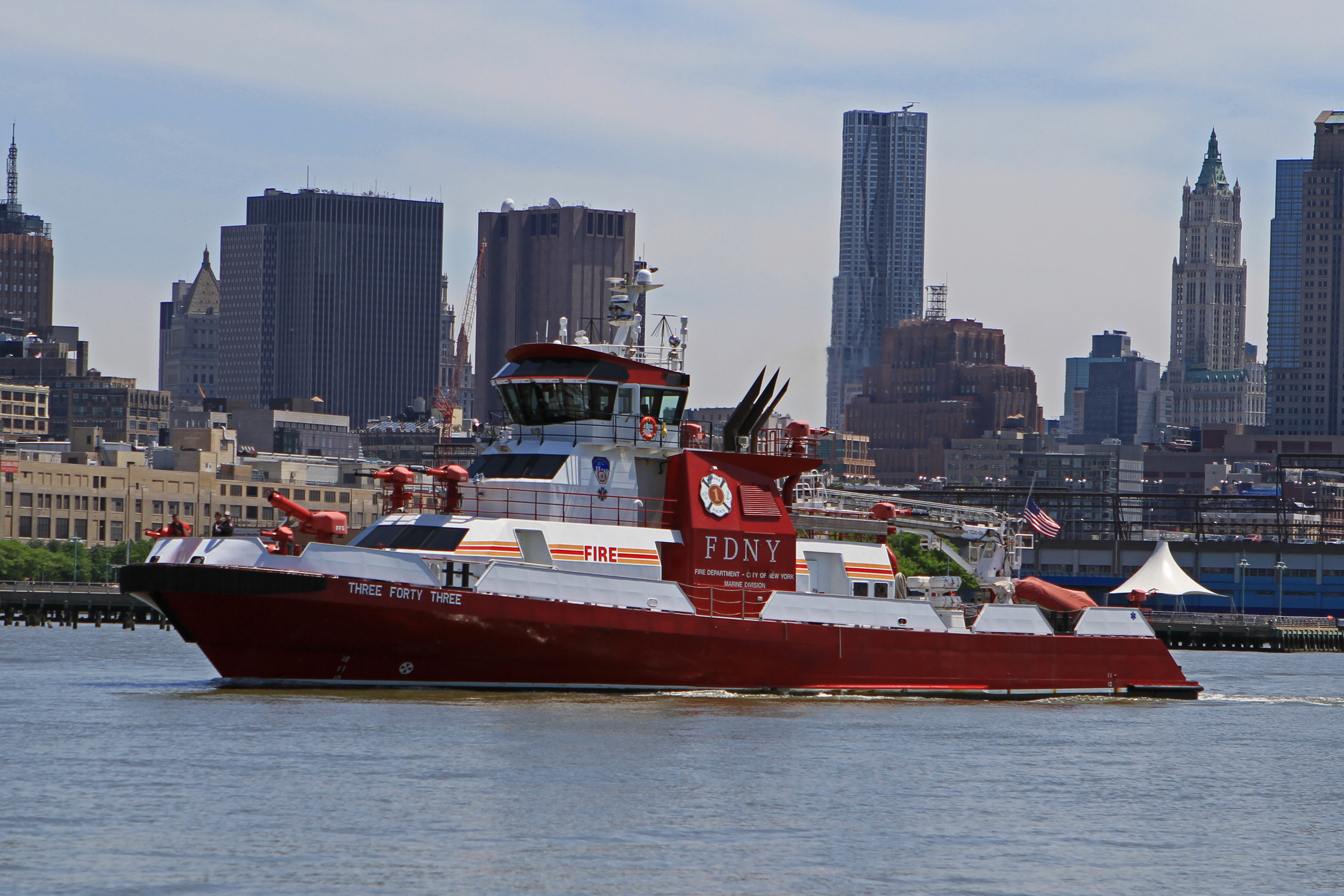
The construction of FDNY's Three Forty Three was partly supported by a port security grant.

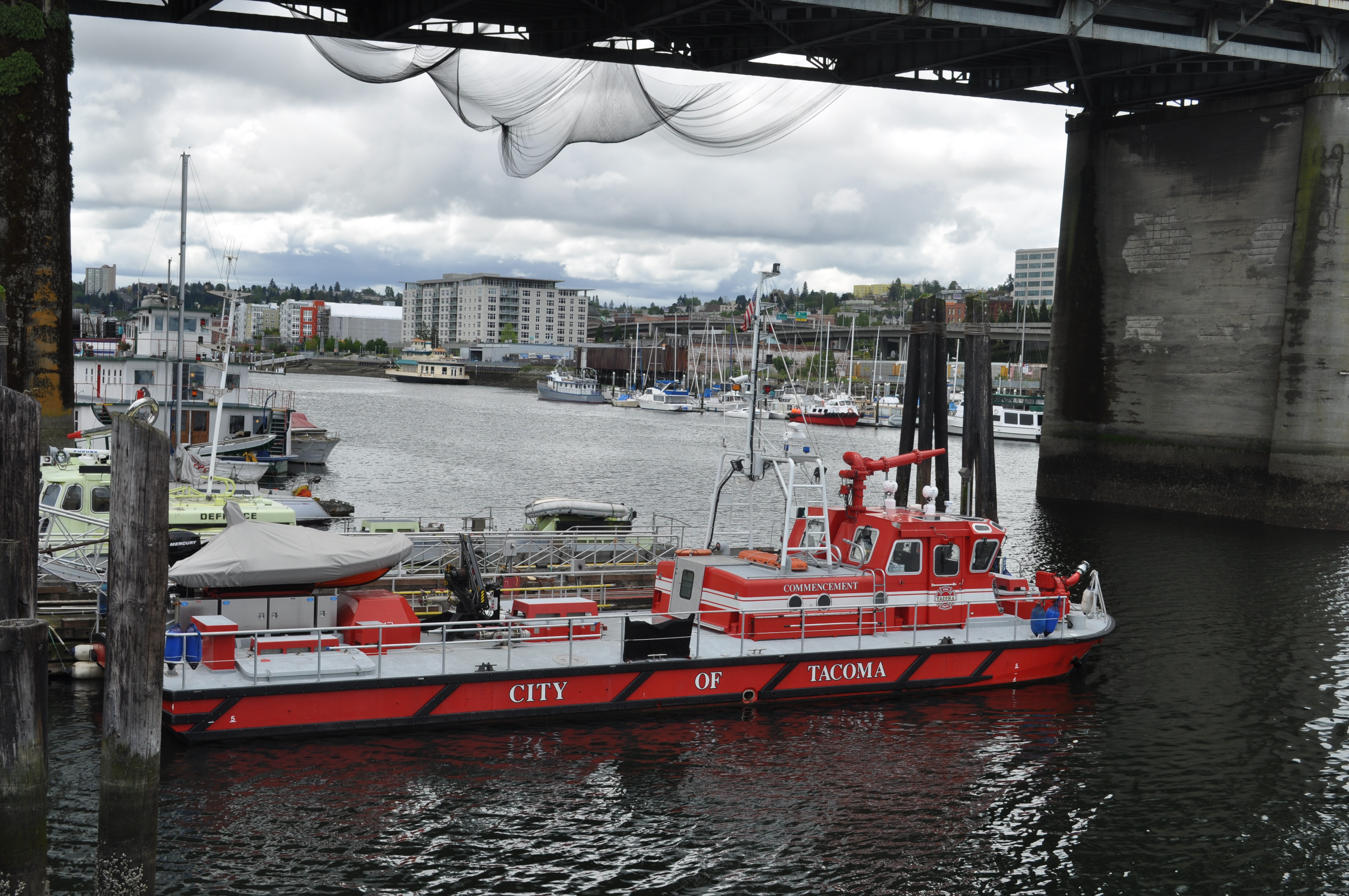
Tacoma's Commencement was refurbished through a port security grant.

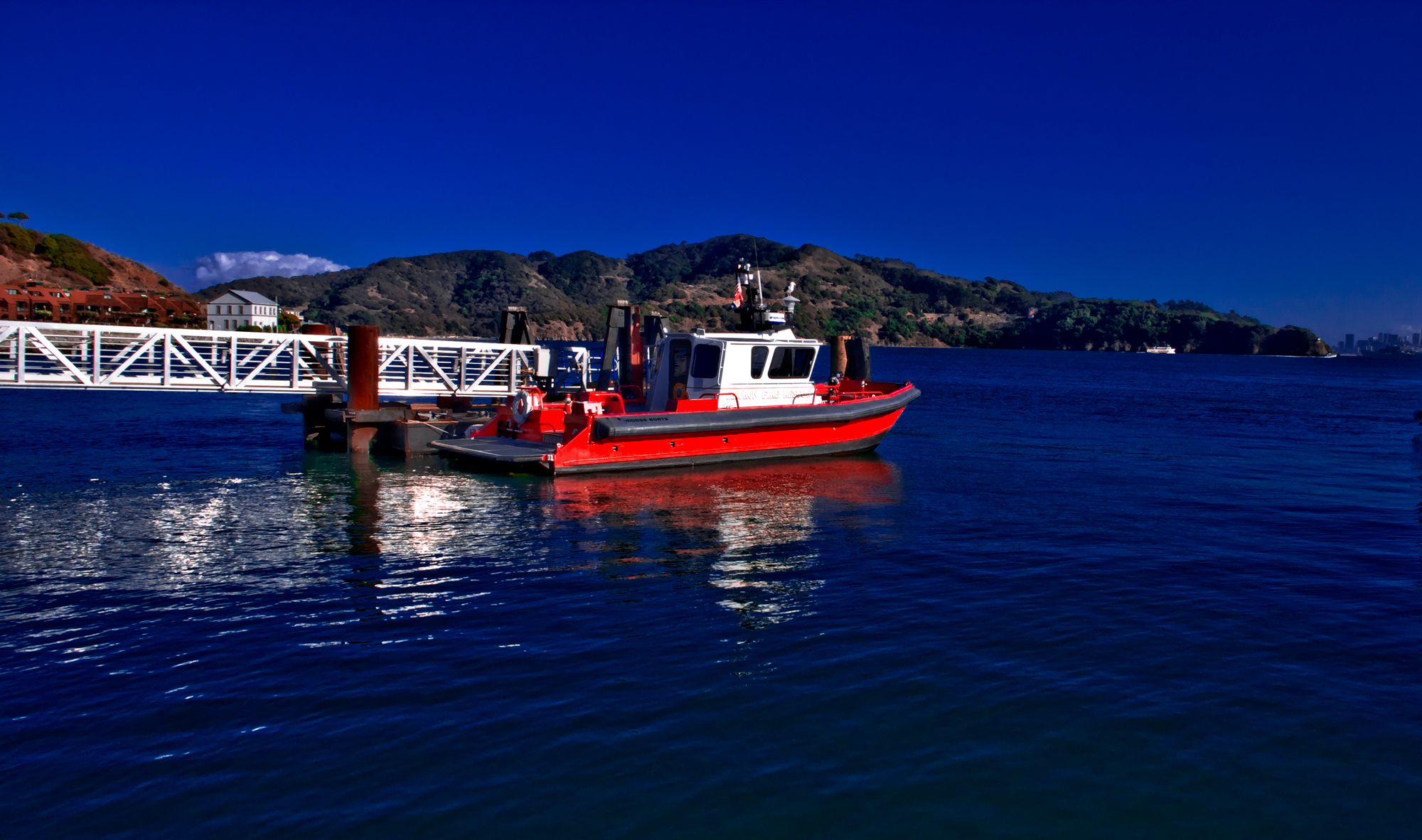
The Tiburon, built through a port security grant, helped extinguish fires on California's islands

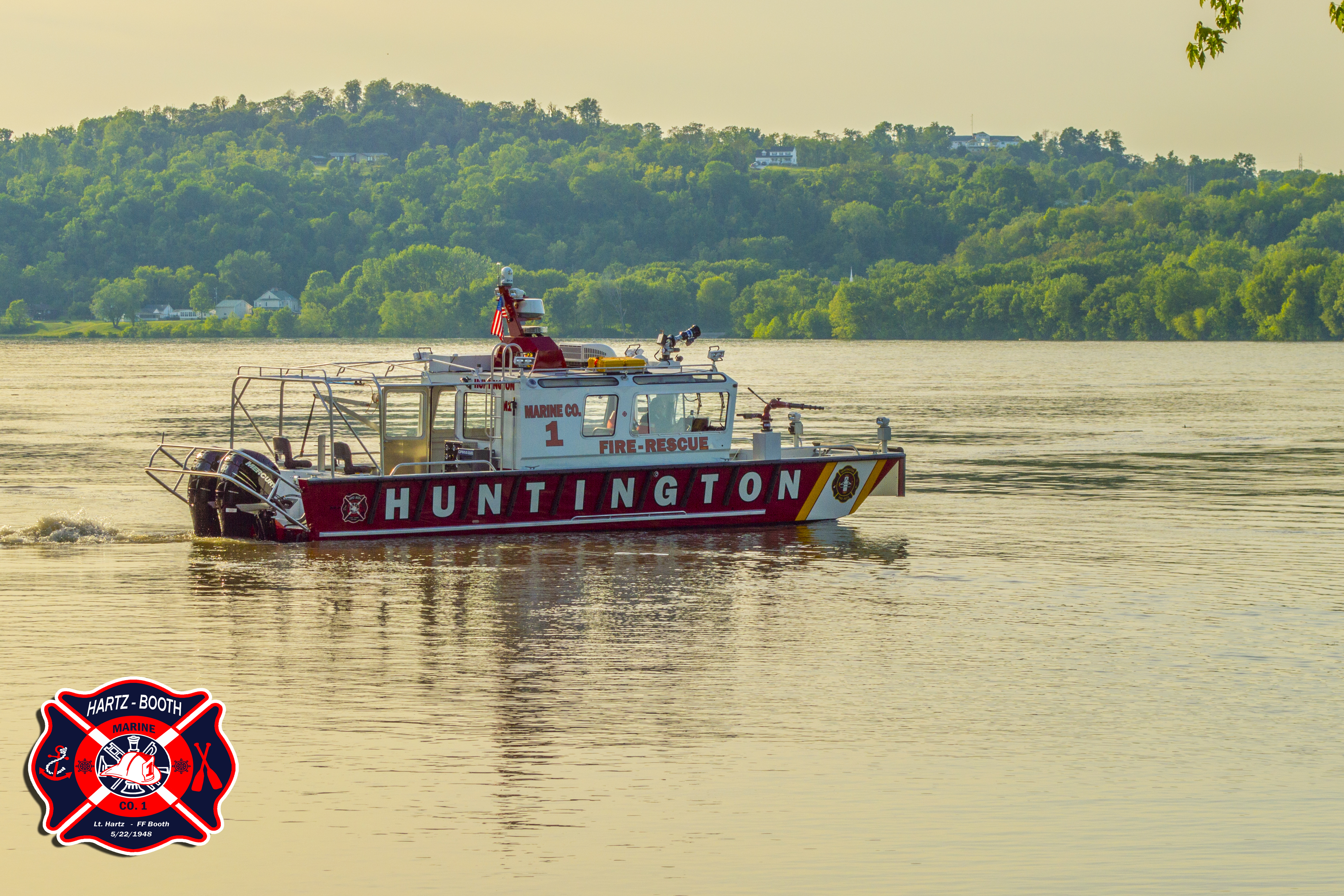
The Hartz-Booth patrols rivers in West Virginia
