= George Williams =

George Williams may refer to:

== Academics ==
- George Williams (priest) (1814–1878), English academic and antiquary
- George C. F. Williams (1857–1933), American medical doctor, genealogist and historian
- George G. Williams (1902–2000), professor of English and creative writing at Rice University
- George Huntston Williams (1914–2000), professor of Unitarian history at Harvard University
- George H. Williams (educator) (1918–2003), president of American University
- George Christopher Williams (1926–2010), American biologist
- George E. Williams (geologist), Australian geologist
- George Williams (lawyer), Australian legal academic

== Entertainment ==
- George Augustus Williams (1814–1901), British landscape painter
- George A. Williams (actor) (1854–1936), American actor of the silent film era
- George Emlyn Williams (1905–1987), Welsh dramatist and actor
- George Williams (comedian) (1910–1995), English comedian
- George Williams (musician) (1917–1988), arranger/composer for big bands
- George Brigars Williams (1929–2016), Ghanaian actor
- George C. Williams (cinematographer), Indian cinematographer
- George Williams (Desperate Housewives), television character
- George W. Williams, vaudeville performer and recording artist, see George Williams and Bessie Brown

== Politics ==
- George Williams (died 1556), MP for Grantham
- George Williams (British politician) (1765–1850), British army officer and Liberal politician
- George Hawkins Williams (1818–1889), American politician and lawyer
- George Henry Williams (1823–1910), United States attorney general and United States senator from Oregon
- George E. Williams (New Jersey politician), member of the New Jersey General Assembly
- George E. Williams (New York politician) (1828–1914), New York assemblyman, 1879
- George Washington Williams (1849–1891), author and Ohio state legislator
- George F. Williams (1852–1932), United States representative from Massachusetts
- George A. Williams (Nebraska politician) (1864–1946), lieutenant governor of Nebraska, 1925–1931
- George Norris Williams (1866–1949), acting Commissioner of Yukon, 1915 to 1916
- George Williams (Michigan politician) (1869–1934), Michigan state senator
- George H. Williams (Missouri politician) (1871–1963), U.S. senator from Missouri
- George S. Williams (1877–1961), U.S. representative from Delaware
- George Hara Williams (1894–1945), Saskatchewan politician

== Sports ==
=== American football ===
- George Williams (American football), head coach at Kansas Wesleyan University in 1916
- George Williams III (born 1975), American football defensive lineman

=== Association football ===
- George Williams (footballer, born 1862) (1862–?), Chirk F.C. and Wales
- George Williams (footballer, born 1879) (1879–1916), Wrexham A.F.C., West Bromwich Albion F.C. and Wales
- George Williams (footballer, born 1881) (1881–1946), Australian rules footballer for St Kilda
- George Williams (footballer, born 1882) (1882–1939), English footballer for Wolverhampton Wanderers
- George Williams (footballer, born 1897) (1897–1957), English footballer with Southampton and Exeter City
- Robert Williams (footballer, born 1932) (George Robert Williams, 1932–2003), English footballer for Mansfield Town
- George Williams (footballer, born 1993), English footballer for Mansfield Town
- George Williams (footballer, born 1995), Wales international footballer for Barrow
- Geraint Williams (born 1962), Welsh football manager nicknamed "George"

=== Baseball ===
- George Williams (Negro leagues) (1864–1918), African American baseball player, Cuban Giants from 1885
- George Williams (infielder) (1939–2009), American baseball player
- George Williams (catcher) (born 1969), American baseball player

=== Basketball ===
- George Williams (basketball, born 1899), American college basketball player in the 1920s
- George Williams (basketball, born 1990), American basketball player

=== Rugby ===
- George Williams (rugby union) (1856–1925), New Zealand rugby union player
- George Williams (rugby league, born 1923), Australian rugby league player
- George Williams (rugby league, born 1994), English rugby league player

=== Other sports ===
- George Williams (Australian footballer) (1871–1937), Australian rules footballer for Collingwood
- George Williams (cricketer) (1880–?), English cricketer
- George Williams (racewalker) (1935–2016), British racewalker
- George Williams (umpire), West Indian cricket umpire in the 1950s
- George Williams (athletics coach), American track and field coach
- George Williams (javelin thrower), winner of the 1932 NCAA DI javelin championship

== Other ==
- Gilly Williams (George James Williams, 1719–1805), English official, wit, and letter writer
- George Williams (physician) (c. 1762–1834), English physician and librarian
- George Ebenezer Williams (1783−1819), English organist and composer
- George Williams (died 1882), leader of the Church of the Firstborn who identified himself as a reincarnation of the prophet Cainan
- George Williams (philanthropist) (1821–1905), English founder of the YMCA
- George Forrester Williams (1837–1920), Gibraltar-born soldier and military adviser who became managing editor of the New York Times
- George C. Williams (Medal of Honor) (1839–1926), Union Army during the American Civil War
- George Williams (Idaho architect) (1860–1929), American architect
- George Washington Williams (naval officer) (1869–1925), US Navy officer
- George Clark Williams (1878–1958), Queen's Counsel and Justice of the Peace
- George Hopkins Williams II (1915–2006), aviation history collector
- George Williams College (Chicago), a campus of Aurora University, Illinois
- Sir George Williams Campus of Concordia University, Montreal, Quebec, Canada
- George Williams (fireboat), see Fireboats of Portland, Oregon

== See also ==
- George W. Williams (disambiguation)
