= Fireboats of Portland, Oregon =

The Portland Fire Bureau of the city of Portland, Oregon owns and operates Fireboats in Portland, Oregon.

In 1973 the Fire Bureau had the responsibility for patrolling the harbor transferred to it from the Police Bureau. The Karl Prehn and the L.V. Jenkins were added to the fleet at that time. These smaller vessels were equipped for both firefighting and constabulary duties. The Bureau maintained seven vessels in the 1970s—its largest extent.

Fireboats of Portland, Oregon
image	name	launched	retired	notes
	George H. Williams	1904	1928	named after Portland's current mayor
	David Campbell	1912	1927	named after former chief David Campbell.
	David Campbell	1928	?	said to be the sister ship to the Mike Laudenklos and Karl Gunster.; extensively rebuilt in 1976.
	Mike Laudenklos	1928	?	said to be the sister ship to the second David Campbell and Karl Gunster.
	Karl Gunster	1928	?	said to be the sister ship to the second David Campbell and Karl Gunster.
	Virgil Spencer	1972	?	a smaller, faster vessel, propelled by waterjets—embarrassingly she sank during her commissioning, but was repaired and served for years.
	Karl Prehn	1973	1984	In 1973 the Fire Bureau had responsibility for harbor patrol duties transferred from the Police Bureau.; Sold to Lewiston, Idaho in 1984.
	L.V. Jenkins	1973	?	In 1973 the Fire Bureau had responsibility for harbor patrol duties transferred from the Police Bureau.
	Rescue Boat 17	?		based on the Columbia River near Jantzen Beach
	Vernon Buss	?		
	George Williams	?		
	Eldon Trinity	2010		this high speed vessel was ordered following a tragedy with response times.

== See also ==
- Fireboats of Baltimore
- Fireboats of Chicago
- Fireboats of Connecticut
- Fireboats of Detroit
- Fireboats of Duluth
- Fireboats of Jacksonville, Florida
- Fireboats of Long Beach, California
- Fireboats of Milwaukee
- Fireboats of New York City
- Fireboats of Philadelphia
- Fireboats of San Diego
- Fireboats of San Francisco
- Fireboats of Toronto
- Fireboats of Vancouver
- Fireboats on the Mississippi River system
- Firefighting in Oregon
