= George W. Williams =

George W. Williams may refer to:

- George Washington Williams (1849–1891), U.S. soldier and politician
- George Washington Williams (naval officer) (1869–1925), American Navy officer
- George W. McWilliams, American Civil War Medal of Honor recipient
- George W. Williams, vaudeville performer and recording artist

== See also ==
- George Williams (disambiguation)
