= Vancouver Fire and Rescue Services =

Emergency services in Vancouver, Canada

Agency overview
- Established: 1886
- Employees: 800
- Staffing: Career
- Fire chief: Karen Fry (December 2020)
- EMS level: First responder
- Motto: People Who Care About You

Facilities and equipment
- Stations: 21
- Engines: 24 (20 engines / 4 squad apparatus)
- Trucks: 10
- Platforms: 1
- HAZMAT: 1
- USAR: 1
- Wildland: 3
- Fireboats: 3
- Light and air: 1

Website
- VFRS

Vancouver Fire and Rescue Services (VFRS) was founded in 1886 and today serves the city of Vancouver, British Columbia. The department provides fire suppression, medical response, technical rescue and hazardous materials response services. In 2017, VFRS responded to 67,000 emergency calls.

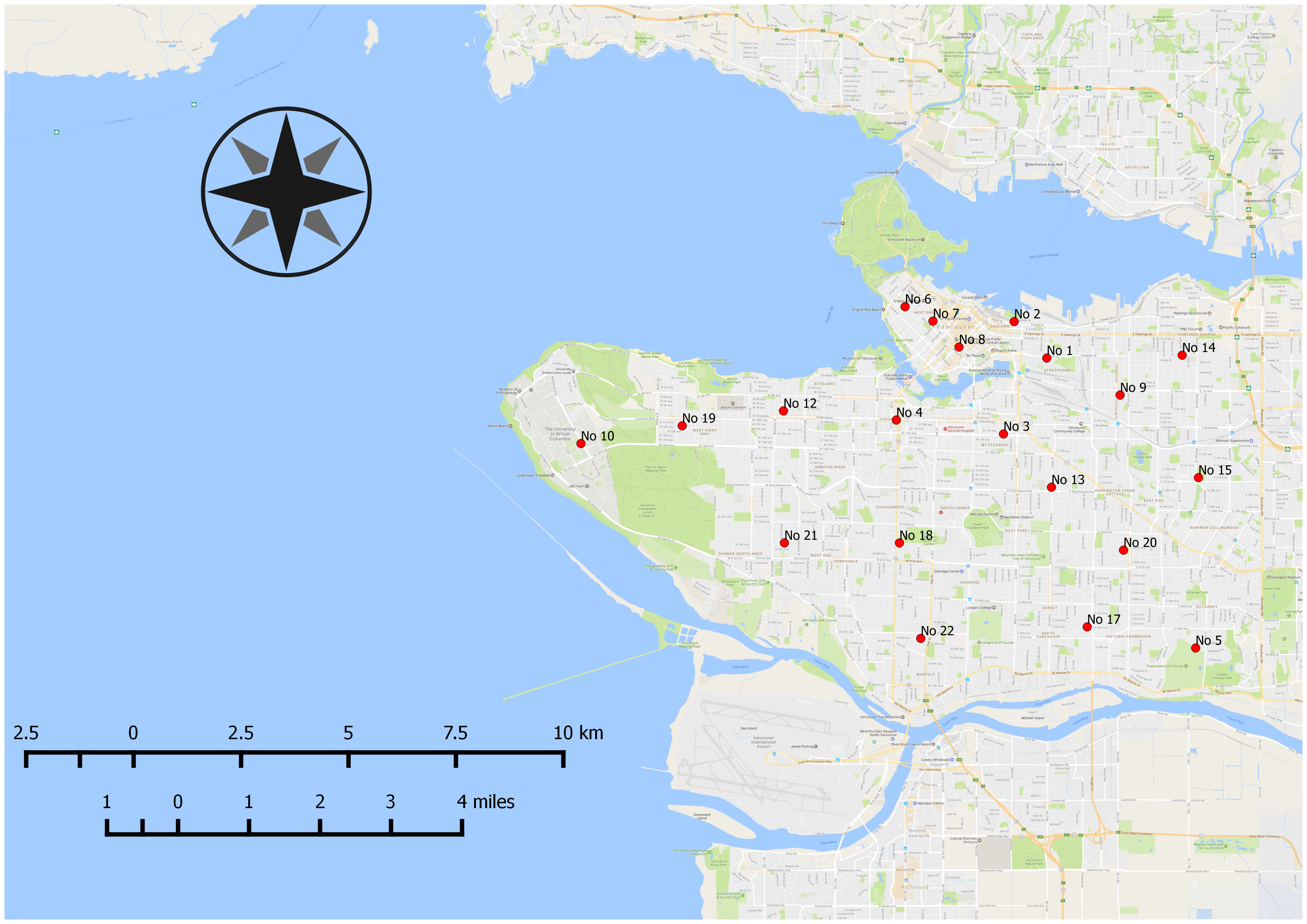
Map of VFRS fire halls in Vancouver

== History ==
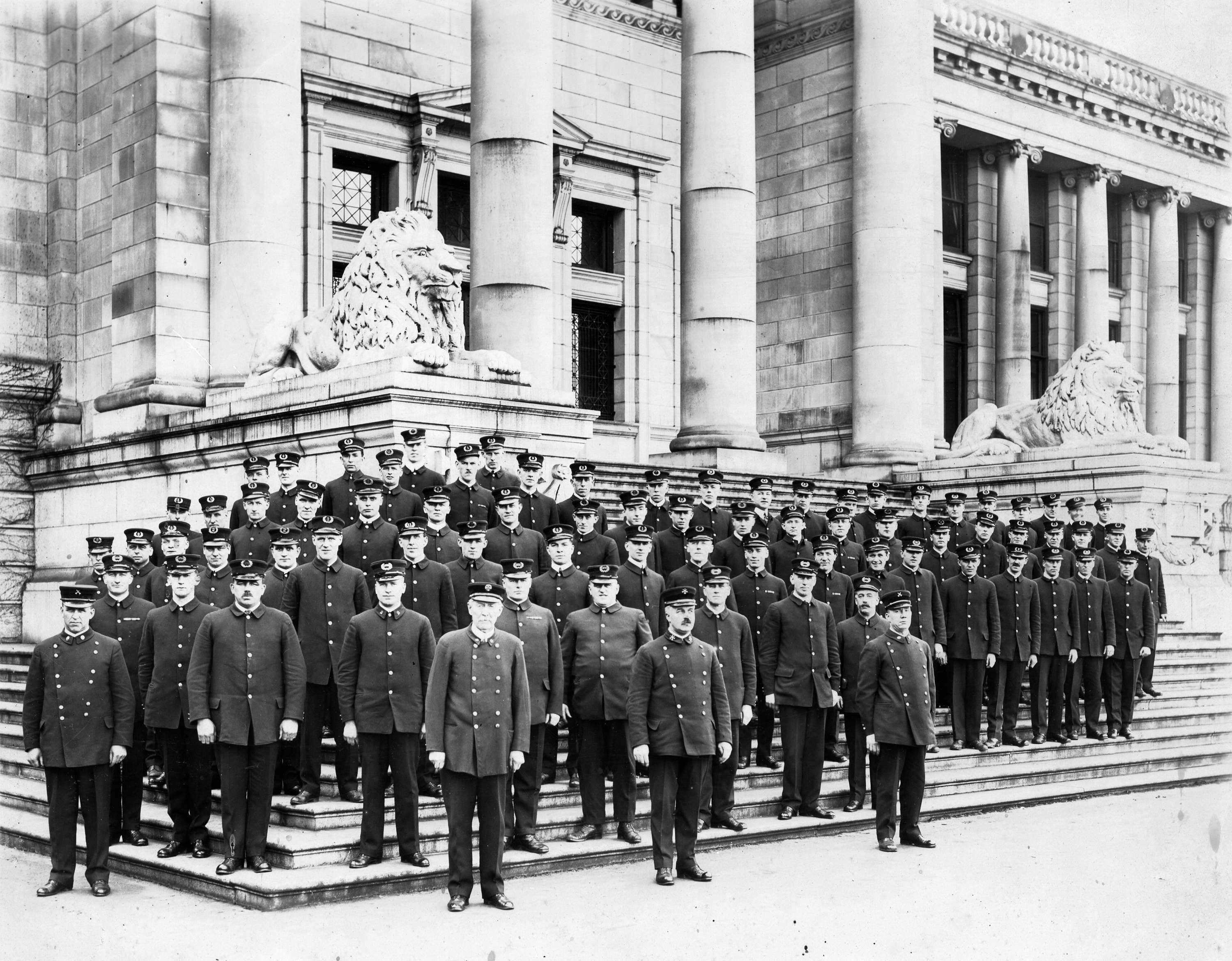
Vancouver Fire Department circa 1925

The Vancouver Volunteer Fire Brigade was established in 1886 with one volunteer hose-wagon company assigned to protect the new city which mainly had lumber mills at the time, and within 16 days of its existence, the city of Vancouver burned to the ground. A week after the fire the city purchased its first fire engine from Ontario, the item arrived in August of that year, which made the volunteers confident that they could handle any situation that occurred. A second engine arrived in 1888 along with two new fire halls growing the strength from one company to three companies. J.H. Charlisle was appointed the city's first fire chief who began motorizing fire brigade, and the first motorized fire engine was purchased in 1908 from the Seagrave company of Columbus. By 1911, the department was ranked third best in the world, falling behind London and Leipzing Germany. By 1917 it was completely motorized (no more horse-drawn equipment) and was then recognized as the Vancouver Fire Department. In 1929 the municipalities of South Vancouver and Point Grey amalgamated with the City of Vancouver which also meant the merger of the South Vancouver Fire Department and the Point Grey Fire Brigade, which added six new halls and increased the strength of the department by 100 men.

Since 1893, 48 Vancouver firefighters have died in the line of duty.

In December 2023, VFRS began operating an electric fire engine out of Fire Hall No. 1 in Strathcona. This was the first electric fire engine to be deployed in Canada. The fire engine was introduced to support the City's goal to reduce fleet emissions and electrify city vehicles.

== Operations ==
=== Rank structure ===
Rank	Fire chief	Deputy fire chief	Assistant chief	Battalion chief	Training officer	Captain	Lieutenant	Firefighter	Probationary firefighter
Rank epaulettes								No insignia	No insignia
Rank pins								No insignia	No insignia
Helmet colour	White	White	White	White	Red	Red	Red	Yellow	Yellow
Description	The Fire Chief is General Manager of Department.	The Deputy Fire Chief is Second-in-command to fire chief	The Assistant Chief is in charge of operations	Battalion Chiefs are in charge of a multitude of Fire Companies/Units and Stations in their respective areas.	Training officer is in charge of firefighter education and departmental education	Captains are in charge of one fire hall and they are company officers for one engine/rescue engine	Lieutenants are in charge of one ladder Truck or secondary engine (pump)	Firefighters have the role of maintaining and mastering personal firefighting and EMS skills	Probationary firefighters have the role of learning how to execute the duties of a firefighter while being mentored by senior firefighters and officers

Current fire chief and general manager: Karen Fry

=== Fire hall locations and apparatus ===
There are currently 21 fire halls located throughout the city of Vancouver, organized into three battalions. There is also a training facility, a marine unit and several pieces of reserve apparatus.

Fire hall	Neighbourhoods	Engine Companies or squad companies	Ladder Companies or tower companies	Rescue (medic) Units or wildland units	Chief units	Special units	Address	Opening date			
1	Strathcona	Engine 1	Ladder 1	Rescue Unit 1	Battalion Chief Unit 1; Assistant Chief Unit 1	Car 73 (fire investigator); Car 75 (fire investigator); Pod 1; Logistics unit; Community Services; Mechanic 1; Mechanic 2	900 Heatley Avenue	August 8, 1975			
2	Downtown Eastside	Engine 2	Ladder 2	Rescue Unit 2			199 Main Street	August 8, 1975			
3	Mount Pleasant	Engine 3	Ladder 3	Rescue Unit 3			2801 Quebec Street	January 27, 2001			
4	Fairview	Engine 4 Pump 4					1475 West 10th Avenue	May 11, 1992			
5	Killarney	Engine 5	Ladder 5			Haz-Mat Unit 5; Mask repair unit	3090 East 54th Avenue	December 2, 2019			
6	West End	Engine 6; Pump 6 (engine)					1001 Nicola Street	March 1, 1908			
7	Downtown	Squad 7	Tower 7	Wildlands Unit 7			1090 Haro Street	December 5, 1974			
8	Yaletown	Engine 8	Ladder 8	Rescue Unit 8			895 Hamilton Street	December 5, 1974			
9	Grandview–Woodland	Engine 9		Technical Rescue Unit 9			1805 Victoria Drive	February 12, 1960			
10	UBC Vancouver	Engine 10	Ladder 10	Wildlands Unit 10		Parade	2992 Wesbrook Mall	1982			
11	Grandview-Woodland	Engine 11					1756 East Hastings Street (Temporary)				
12	Kitsilano	Squad 12					2460 Balaclava Street	July 11, 1987			
13	Riley Park	Engine 13				Command 13				4013 Prince Albert Street	April 4, 2003
14	Hastings–Sunrise	Engine 14					2804 Venables Street	August 13, 1979			
15	Renfrew–Collingwood	Squad 15	Ladder 15	Rescue Unit 15	Battalion Chief Unit 2		3003 East 22nd Avenue	March 26, 2012			
17	Victoria–Fraserview	Engine 17	Ladder 17	Tech Rescue 17	Wildlands Unit 17		Tech Rescue Unit 17; Hose Tender	7070 Knight Street	April 27, 2022		
18	Shaughnessy	Engine 18	Ladder 18		Battalion Chief Unit 3	Air & Light Unit 18; Decon Unit 18; Haz-Mat Tender 18; Rehab Support Unit 18	1375 West 38th Avenue	July 22, 2000			
19	West Point Grey	Engine 19					4396 West 12th Avenue	July 3, 1980			
20	Kensington–Cedar Cottage	Engine 20				Antique	5402 Victoria Drive	November 9, 1962			
21	Kerrisdale	Engine 21					5425 Carnarvon Street	June 7, 1985			
22	Marpole–Oakridge	Squad 22	Ladder 22	Rescue Unit 22			1005 West 59th Avenue	June 18, 1982			
Training facility	Strathcona					Special Operations unit; HUSAR Support unit; Logistics unit	1330 Chess Street				
Marine unit						Fireboat 1; Fireboat 2; Fireboat 5	Various locations				
Reserve apparatus		Engines (x5); Squad (x1)	Ladders (x2)								

Vancouver's current complement of fire apparatus includes:

- 13x 2007 Spartan / Smeal CAFS engines
- 2x 2007 Spartan / Smeal CAFS 125' aerial ladder quints
- 2x 2007 Spartan / SVI custom-built hazmat units (1 unit later converted to command unit)
- 1x 2007 Spartan / SVI air/light equipment unit
- 14x 2016/17 Spartan / Smeal CAFS engines/rescue-engines
- 10x 2016/17 Spartan / Smeal CAFS 105' aerial ladder quints
- 1x 2016 Spartan / SVI technical heavy rescue

== Fireboats ==
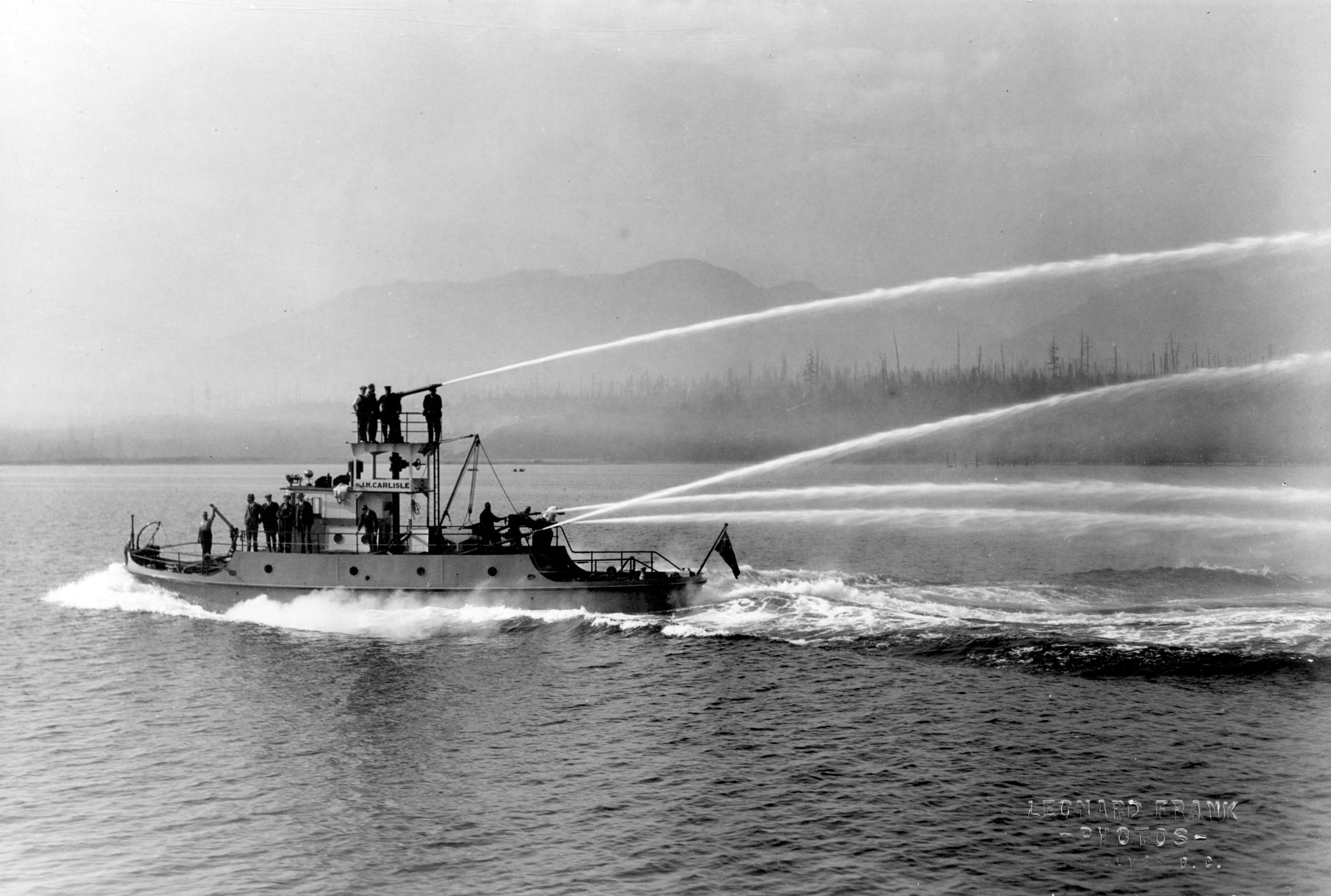
Fireboat J.H. Carlisle, 1928

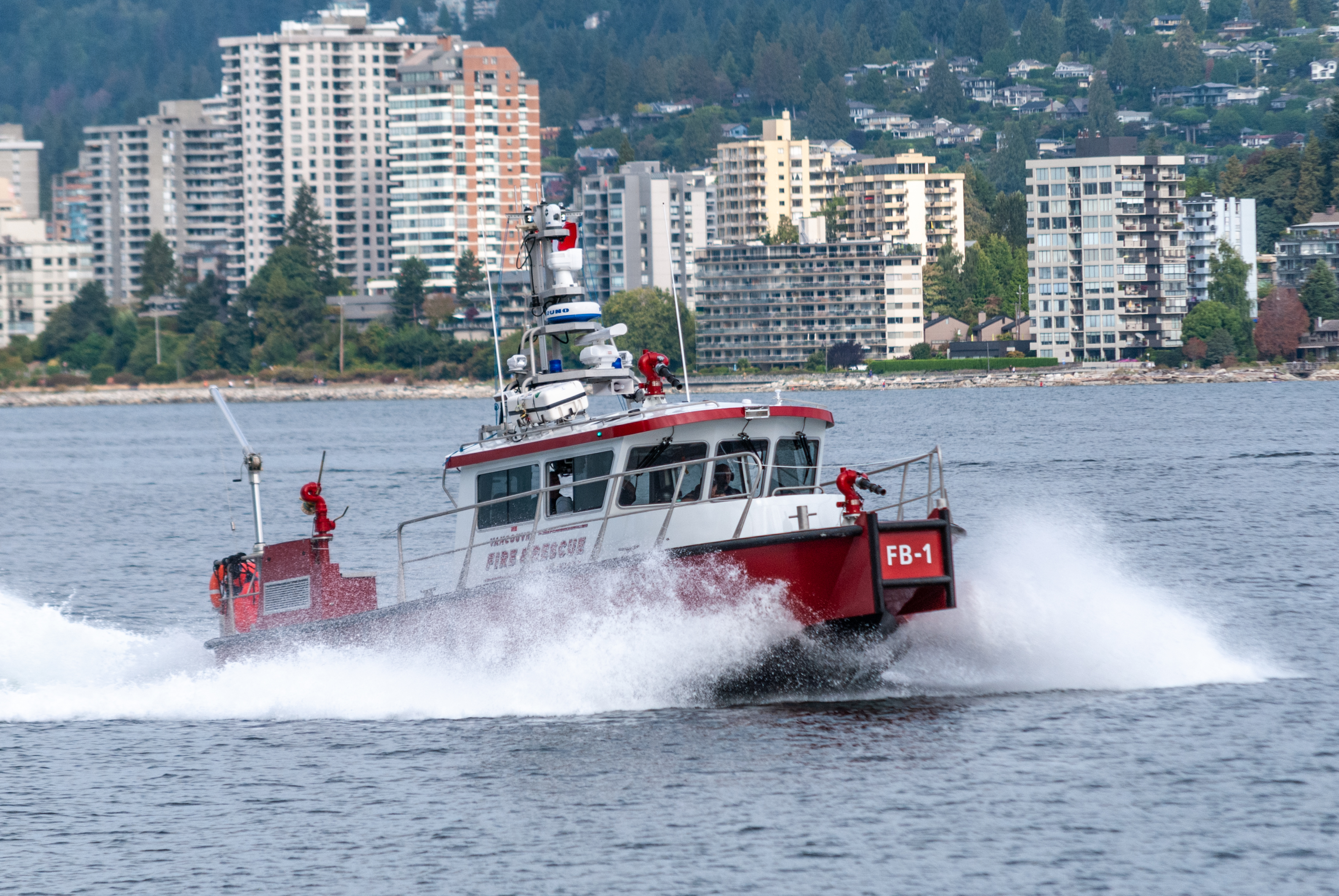
City of Vancouver, Fireboat 1 (FB-1) running under Lion's Gate Bridge into Vancouver Harbor

The VFRS has operated fireboats since 1928 when the city introduced the J.H. Carlisle. It currently operates 3 boats. Fireboats 1 (FB-1) and 2 (FB-2) are Firestorm 40s, built by MetalCraft Marine in Kingston, Ontario. These boats went into service in 2016 and 2017. Fireboat 4 was part of a fleet of five aluminum boats designed by naval engineering firm Robert Allan Ltd. and built in 1992 and has been retained as a reserve vessel.

Former fireboats:

- J.H. Carlisle 1928–1971
- Fireboat No. 2 1951–1987

== Crest ==
VFRS uses a standard logo displayed on uniforms and vehicles:

- Maltese cross
- Fire hydrant
- EMS Star of Life
- Helmet, ladder, horn, hook and axe

== Response ==
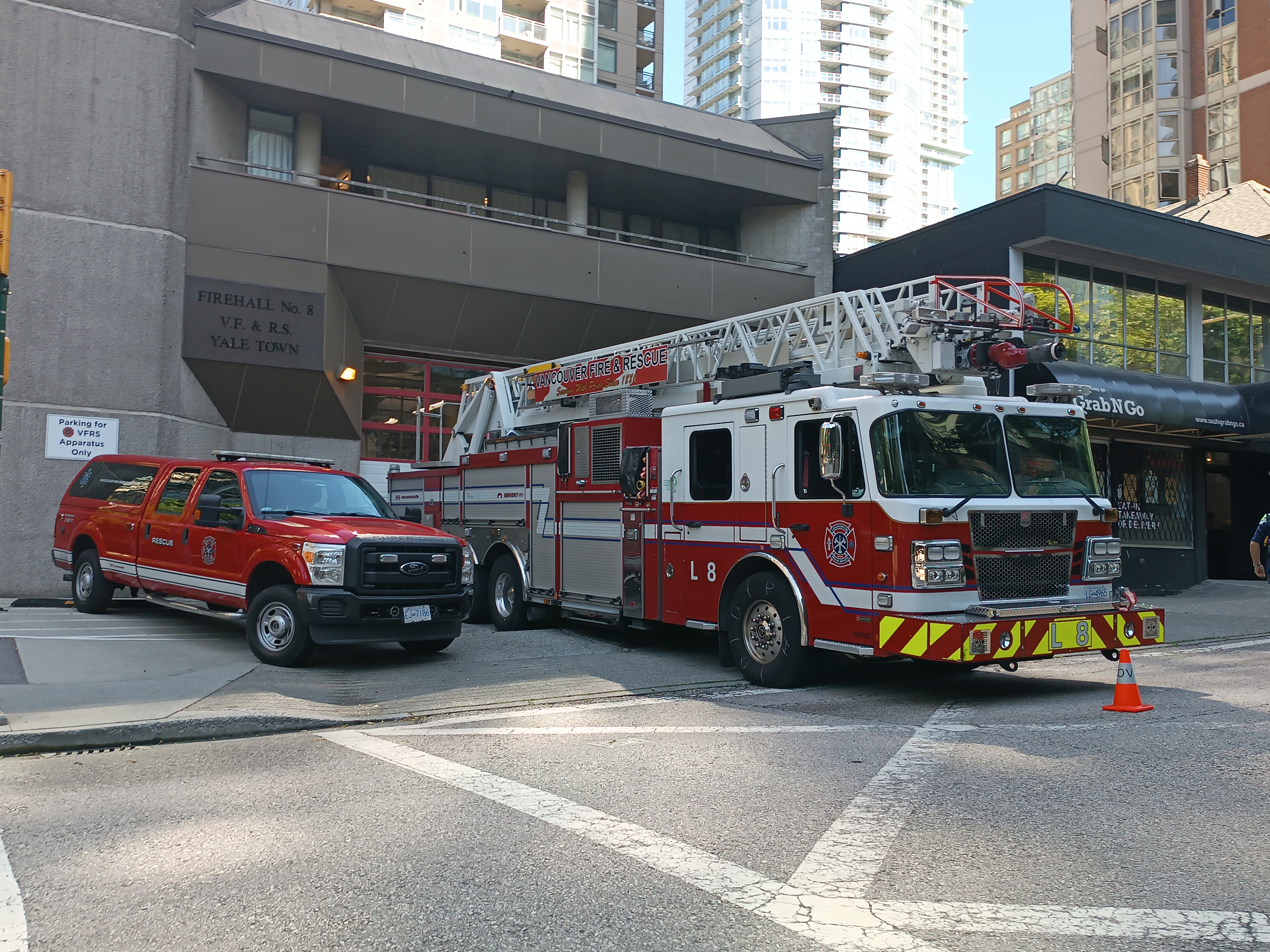
Trucks in front of the Firehall n°8 of the Vancouver Fire Rescue Services

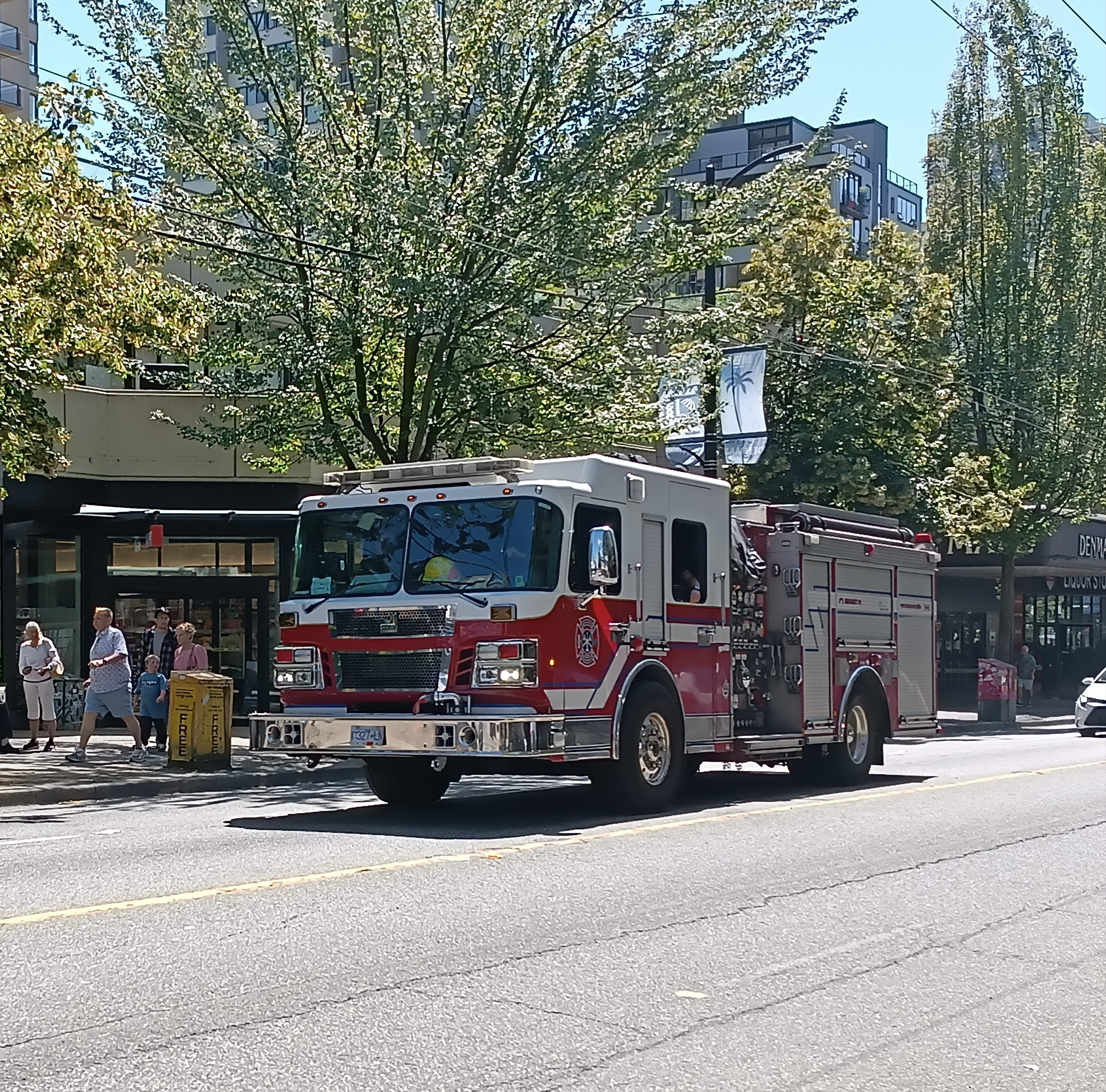
Vancouver fire truck

=== Tap out response medical aids ===
Call type	Number of rigs needed
General	1 apparatus
Cardiac arrest	1 apparatus (2 for full cardiac arrest)
Stroke	1 apparatus
Stabbing	1 apparatus
Shooting	1 apparatus
Mass casualty incident (5 or more patients)	2 apparatus and battalion chief

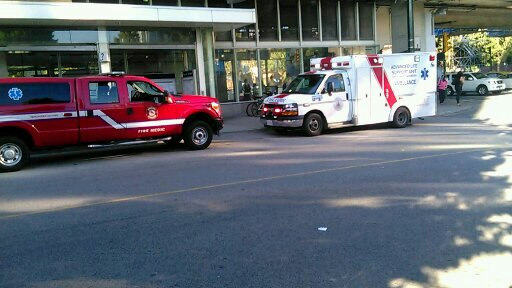
Medic 15 on scene of a medical incident

=== Tap out response non-medical incidents ===
Call type	Number of rigs
Motor vehicle incident	1 apparatus with pumping capability
Motor vehicle incident (multiple patients)	1 rescue engine or engine capability and 1 medic or 1 rescue
Motor vehicle rollover	1 rescue engine and battalion chief or 1 medic
General fire alarm (low risk)	1 apparatus with pumping capability
General fire alarm (moderate risk)	1 apparatus with pumping capability and 1 ladder
General fire alarm (high risk) or reported structure fire	4 apparatus with pumping capability and 1 medic / rescue unit and 1 battalion chief
Rubbish fire	1 apparatus with pumping capability
Vehicle fire	1 apparatus with pumping capability
Vehicle fire Alternative fuel	2 apparatus with pumping capability
Wildland fire smoldering	1 apparatus with pumping capability
Wildland fire small area	1 apparatus with pumping capability and 1 wildland vehicle
Wildland fire large area	2 apparatus with pumping capability and 1 wildland vehicle

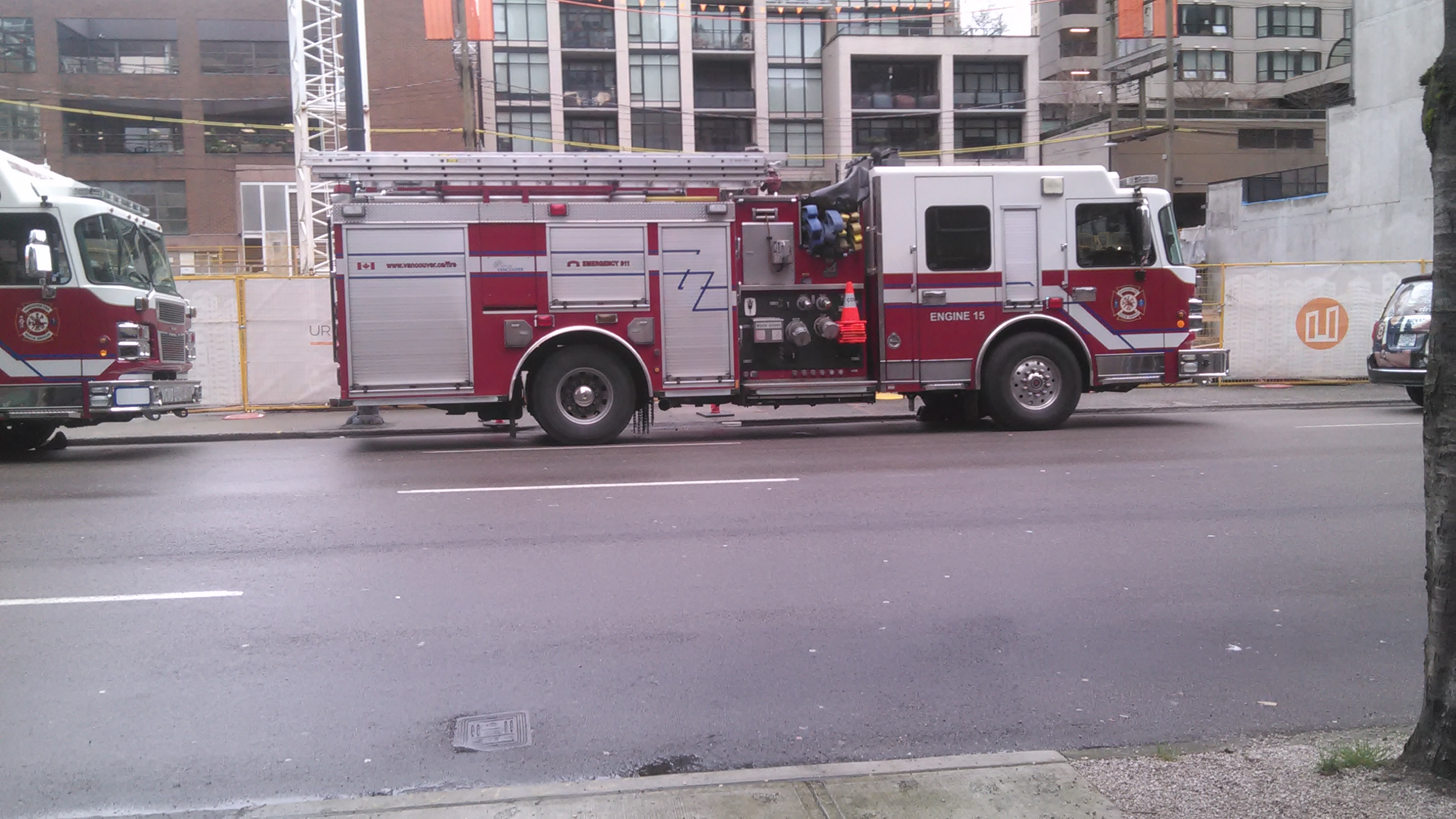
Engine 15 staged at Granville and Davie

=== Structure fire response ===
Alarm	Apparatus
1st alarm assignment	4 apparatus with pumping capability; 1 medic / rescue unit; 1 battalion chief
Working fire assignment	1 rescue engine (rit); 1 air light unit; 1 rehab support unit; 1 fire investigator; 1 additional battalion chief
2nd alarm assignment	2 apparatus with pumping capability
3rd alarm assignment	2 additional fire apparatus; 1 command vehicle (optional); Staff battalion; Other apparatus as requested
4th alarm assignment (after deputy chief approval)	Additional apparatus as requested
5th alarm assignment	Additional apparatus as requested
6th alarm assignment	Additional apparatus as requested
7th alarm assignment	Additional apparatus as requested
8th alarm assignment	Additional apparatus as requested
9th alarm assignment	May involve mutual aid
10th alarm assignment	May involve mutual aid

=== Call volume by hall ===
Fire hall	Location	Number of calls	Busiest apparatus
Fire Hall 2	Downtown Eastside	1200+ per month	Medic 23
Fire Hall 7	Downtown	500+ per month	Rescue engine 7
Fire Hall 8	Yaletown	500+ per month	Medic 8

=== Call volume by year ===
Year	Overall	Busiest unit	Top call
2013	30,000	Engine 7	Medical aid
2014	38,000	Engine 2	Medical aid
2015	44,000	Medic 2	Medical aid

== Major incidents and disasters ==
=== Great Vancouver Fire ===
On 13 June 1886, workers were burning brush to make way for development when high winds picked up the flames and began burning out of control in what became known as the Great Vancouver Fire. Vancouver Volunteer Hosewagon Company No. 1, comprising a dozen volunteers, grabbed buckets and axes in attempt to extinguish the conflagration. The city had purchased a fire engine which had not yet arrived and most of the city burned down in 45 minutes.

=== BC Forest Products ===
On 3 July 1960, a fire broke out at the BC Forest Products Mill near Oak Street and W 6th Avenue. Initial crews responded and reported large flames and smoke coming from the mill. The chief on scene quickly upgraded the alarm calling in additional companies. Flames started to spread quickly from the mill itself to a nearby dock, which resulted in the chief declaring the incident as a five alarm call, VFRS's first five-alarm fire. All halls were tapped out which sent the fire boat and all but a few apparatus down to the fire ground. A total of 350 firefighters battled the flames for hours on the hot day. A large crowd had gathered to watch firefighting operations which hampered efforts to extinguish the blaze. Most of the mill burned before the fire was extinguished.

=== Stanley Cup Riot (2011) ===
On 15 June 2011, the Vancouver Canucks were in the final game of the Stanley Cup playoffs. Over 100,000 people had gathered in the Downtown core to watch the game on large outdoor screens. Around 8 p.m., the game was nearing the end with Canucks losing by several points and, at that moment, the crowd started to become unruly. Families decided to leave before the game was over and headed out of the Downtown core. Police officers staged near the CBC live site at Georgia and Cambie moved into a large crowd of fans when they started throwing objects at the large screen. The crowd at the CBC live site flipped over a pickup truck outside the Canada Post building and lit it ablaze. Police offices formed a circle around the burning truck and cleared a path for Engine 8 to bring in a Supply line and crew. Engine 8's crew were able to knock down the fire but were forced to leave the area as the crowd started throwing objects at police officers. The Emergency Operations Centre was activated and police teams were sent to various intersections to form up and don riot gear. Multiple fire apparatus were sent to key locations and were told to stage and remain visible in case people required medical treatment or had information to report. Around 8:30 p.m., violence spilled into other areas of the Downtown core resulting in fights, rubbish fires and burning vehicles. Fire crews were unable to reach some of the injured as violent crowds continued with destruction and mayhem. Orders were given at 9 p.m. for all staged apparatus to return to quarters and wait for further instructions due to the fact at the time Vancouver Police was deploying crowd control officers armed with tear gas and flash grenades. Dozens of 911 calls were being made from the Downtown core, reporting various incidents such as fires and medical events; however, these incidents could not be confirmed without an apparatus being dispatched to the scene. Crews were sent to investigate the incidents while remaining in constant communication with the Emergency Operations Centre. At around 10 p.m., a call came in reporting a fire inside a parking structure at Seymour and W Georgia, which sent a full alarm assignment, including Ladder 7 which had just wrapped up an investigation of a possible person that had been severely beaten. Ladder 7 reported Georgia Street being as being completely impassable and informed dispatch that any crews responding to an incident on that street would have to walk into that crowd. Upon arrival at the parking structure, Engine 7 found a fully involved vehicle on fire with several other vehicles burning. Battalion 1 went inside the parking structure and found people on the roof and determined that they were not willing to come down. Dispatch advised crews that a police line was headed in their direction to control the violent crowd outside the parking structure. Reports later came in of 2 vehicles burning on Granville Street in front of the Hudson's Bay department store, which was confirmed by a police helicopter. Engine 7 and Quint 6 were sent into the area, but there was nothing that could be done as people were jumping through the flames and were smashing store front windows. Vancouver police sent a tactical squad to the location of the fire and quickly cleared the street using tear gas and rubber bullets, which allowed fire crews to knock the fire, which was close to setting the building alight, down. It took only 3 hours for police and emergency personal to bring the situation under control; a full review of the incident was conducted by the provincial government.

=== Granville Seniors Centre ===
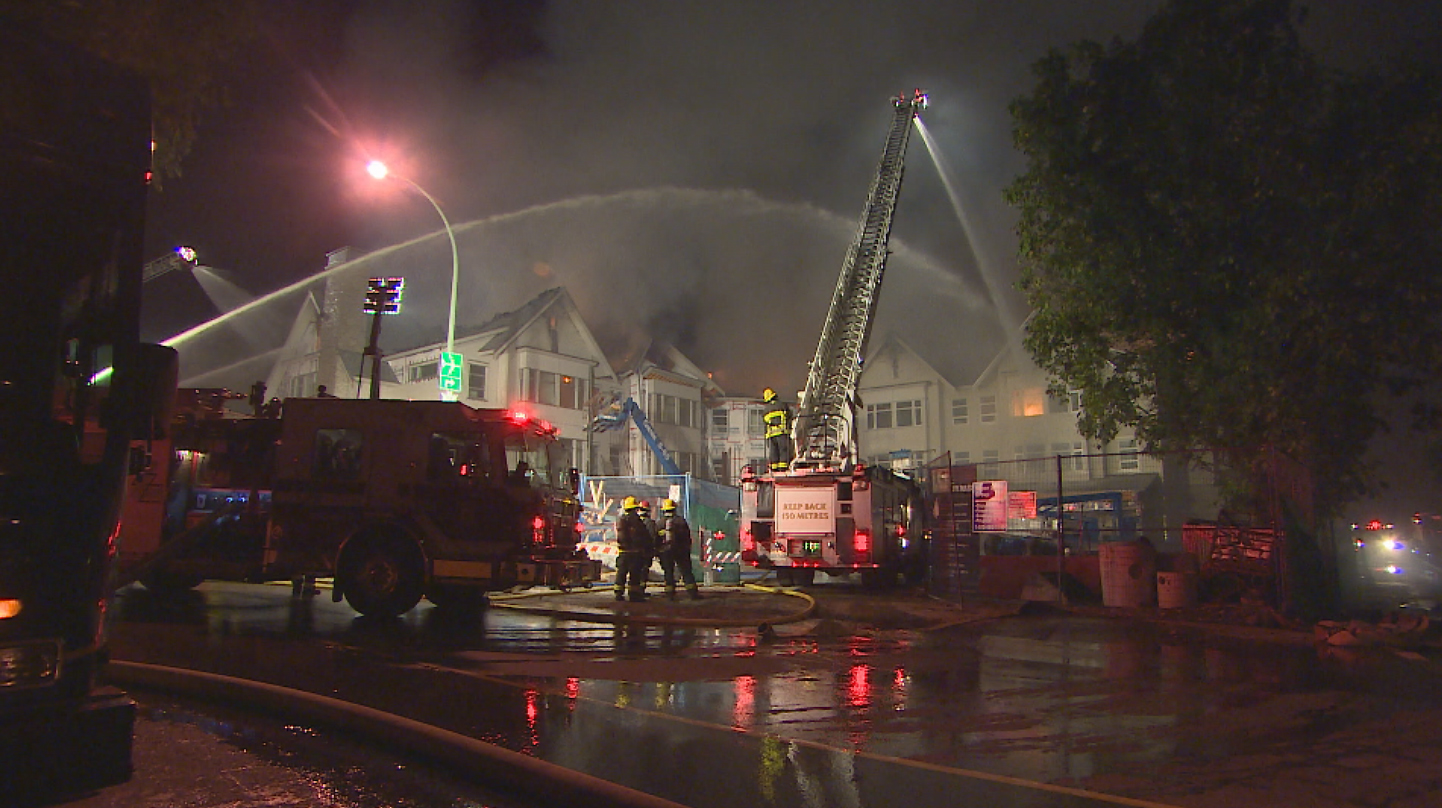
4-alarm structure fire at Granville Seniors Centre

Calls started coming in around 18:50 on 3 October 2014 about a fire at a construction site on Granville Street and 49th Avenue in Vancouver. Initial units that were dispatched were able to see the large column of thick black smoke that was visible all around the Lower Mainland. Vancouver Battalion Chief 3 made it a working fire before any crews arrived on scene. Once crews arrived on scene they reported a large working structure fire of a four or five story complex under construction. Fire had originated in the top floor and was spreading quickly. Before crews arrived it had engulfed most of the roof and was spreading to the sides quickly. On arrival of Battalion Chief 3, he immediately made it a 3rd Alarm Fire as large numbers of crews were required to knock the fire down and prevent exposure of nearby buildings. Granville Street was quickly shutdown, creating major traffic problems and the Vancouver Police Department were called in for traffic control. British Columbia Ambulance Service was also request for standby. The fire was quickly upgraded to a 4th Alarm before crews were able to get the fire under control. Security on site had reported that there may be some propane tanks inside the building for construction use. The roof and sides of the building began to collapse after about an hour and police pushed most spectators back a block or more. Rehab and Command was set up at Granville Street & 49th Avenue. Staging was also set up on Granville Street & 49th Avenue on 49th Avenue on the North side. A firefighter required medical treatment after the majority of the fire was knocked down and no other injuries were reported. The trolley cables for the electric buses were shut down on Granville Street due to the proximity of the fire. Crews remained on scene during the night and all day on Saturday 4 October. In the late morning of 4 October 2014, Granville Street had to be closed to traffic for more than an hour after a large flare up required several units to be brought in to help fight the flare up.

=== Port Metro Vancouver fire ===
On 4 March 2015, a security guard at the Port of Vancouver noticed smoke coming from a shipping container. He immediately notified E-Comm 911 which in turn activated a report of a smoke call. Battalion 1 was placed in charge of the scene and upon arrival, declared the incident a structural fire for thick white smoke could be seen emerging from the container. A working alarm assignment was declared immediately followed by a 2nd alarm which included response from Hazmat 18, Vancouver Police, and BC Ambulance Service. Hazmat 18 crew identified the burning content as trichloroisocyanuric acid, a dangerous chemical. Command immediately declared the event as a 3rd alarm and additional police units were called in to evacuate the zone. Warnings were issued to people living in the vicinity to stay at home and lock their doors and windows to prevent gas from entering. At around 3 pm, a 4th alarm was declared and Command 4 was dispatched to the scene along with assistant chiefs. Command 4 requested fireboats 3 and 5 attend the scene. Fire boats worked from the water side to extinguish the fire while firefighters attacked the flames from aerial ladders. Crews remained on scene for several days trying to put out hot spots.

=== Carleton School fire ===
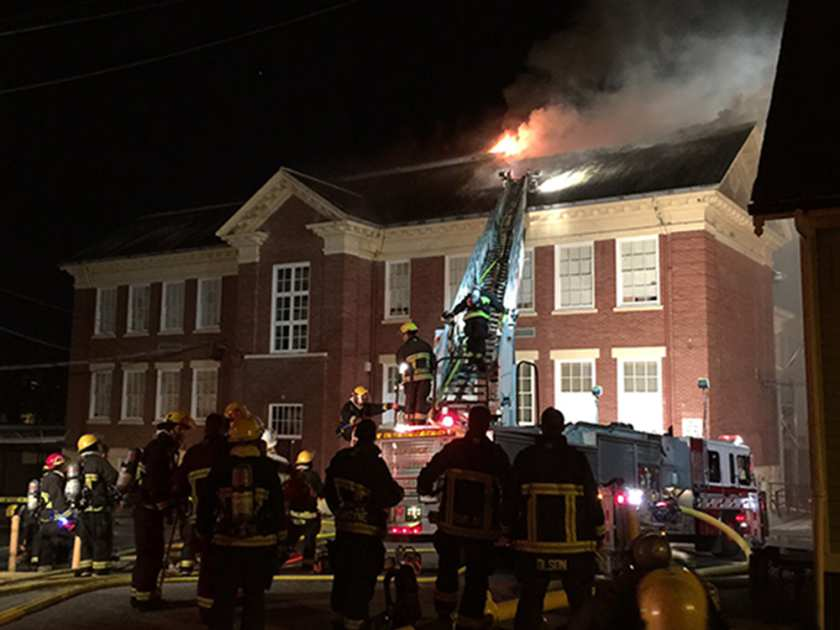
Crews attacking stubborn fire at Carleton Elementary

On 19 August 2016, Vancouver Fire Dispatch received a complaint of possible smoke in the area of Kingsway and Joyce. Dispatch tapped out Engine 5, Engine 15, Quint 15, Quint 20, Medic 9 and Battalion 2 to the scene. While crews were en route to the call, dispatch received multiple calls from area residents and passersby about smoke billowing out of the roof of Carleton Elementary School. The call was quickly upgraded to structure fire and all crews responding were notified of the development. Upon arrival Engine 5 assumed command of the scene and, confirmed reports of smoke coming from the roof. Engine 5 radioed for Quint 20 to lay line at the rear of the structure, and requested all other apparatus to remain at level 1 staging. Quint 20 laid a 1/4 inch hoseline into the building and went to the 3rd floor where heavy fire was present. Command requested a working fire assignment and ordered all other rigs to lay lines accordingly. Before Quint 20 could contain the situation, the flames had already spread into the attic and upper cock loft area, which led to command requesting a 2nd alarm assignment. Quint 20's crew was able to clear fire from the main fire floor and proceed into the attic space however, the attic was quite tight due to the structure being around for over 100 years. A 3rd alarm assignment was called in for manpower as crews cleared the building quickly to resupply on breathing apparatus which ran low. Ladder 17 setup on Mckinnon st, and made an effort to assault the fire from the side of the structure which seemed to have only a small impact on the fire. Crews were unable to assault the fire from above as crews were directly underneath in the attic with hose lines. Command upgraded the call to a 4th Alarm as additional manpower was needed. Three firefighters had to be taken to hospital, as two members suffered smoke inhalation and one member strained his back. The fire was contained several hours later and crews remained on scene to investigate. The fire investigator revealed that someone had broken into the school, and had poured an accelerant near the door to the third floor.

== Training facility ==
The Vancouver Fire Rescue Services training facility (also known as the Chess Street training grounds) has a burn building and several classrooms. There is also a base for the CAN-TF1 HUSAR (Canada Task Force 1 Heavy Urban Search And Rescue Team). The training facility also hosts the department's youth academy outreach program, a week long firefighting academy for senior high school students. BC first responders level 3 and the first aid course required by firefighters is also taught at this facility.

== Band ==
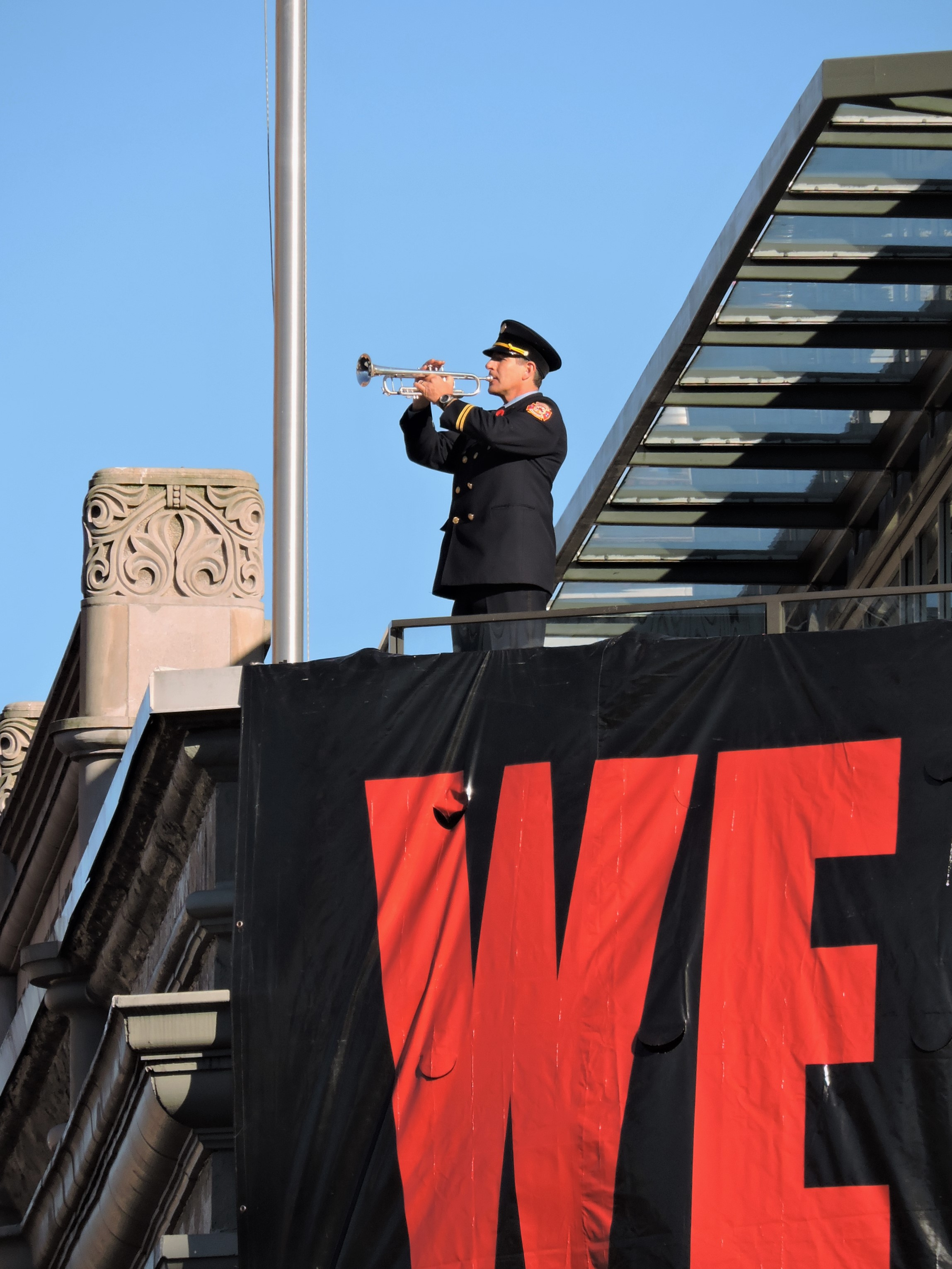
A trumpeter of the VFRS Band during the Remembrance Day services at Vancouver's Victory Square, 12 November 2014

The Vancouver Fire and Rescue Services Band is a community outreach program for the VFRS. Together, the Vancouver Police Pipe Band and the VFRS Band serve as the two official bands of the City of Vancouver. The VFRS Band was founded in 1927 and is the longest-serving fire department band in North America. The band is composed of active-duty and retired firefighters, as well as some independent civilians.

The band performs at a range of events including:

- Formal city ceremonies
- Departmental funeral services
- Annual Remembrance Day service in Victory Square, Vancouver
- Vancouver Fire Rescue Services Medal Presentation ceremonies
- Community festivals
- Civic parades

Kevin Lee, a professional musician and retired music teacher from the Semiahmoo Secondary School music program, is the director of the band.

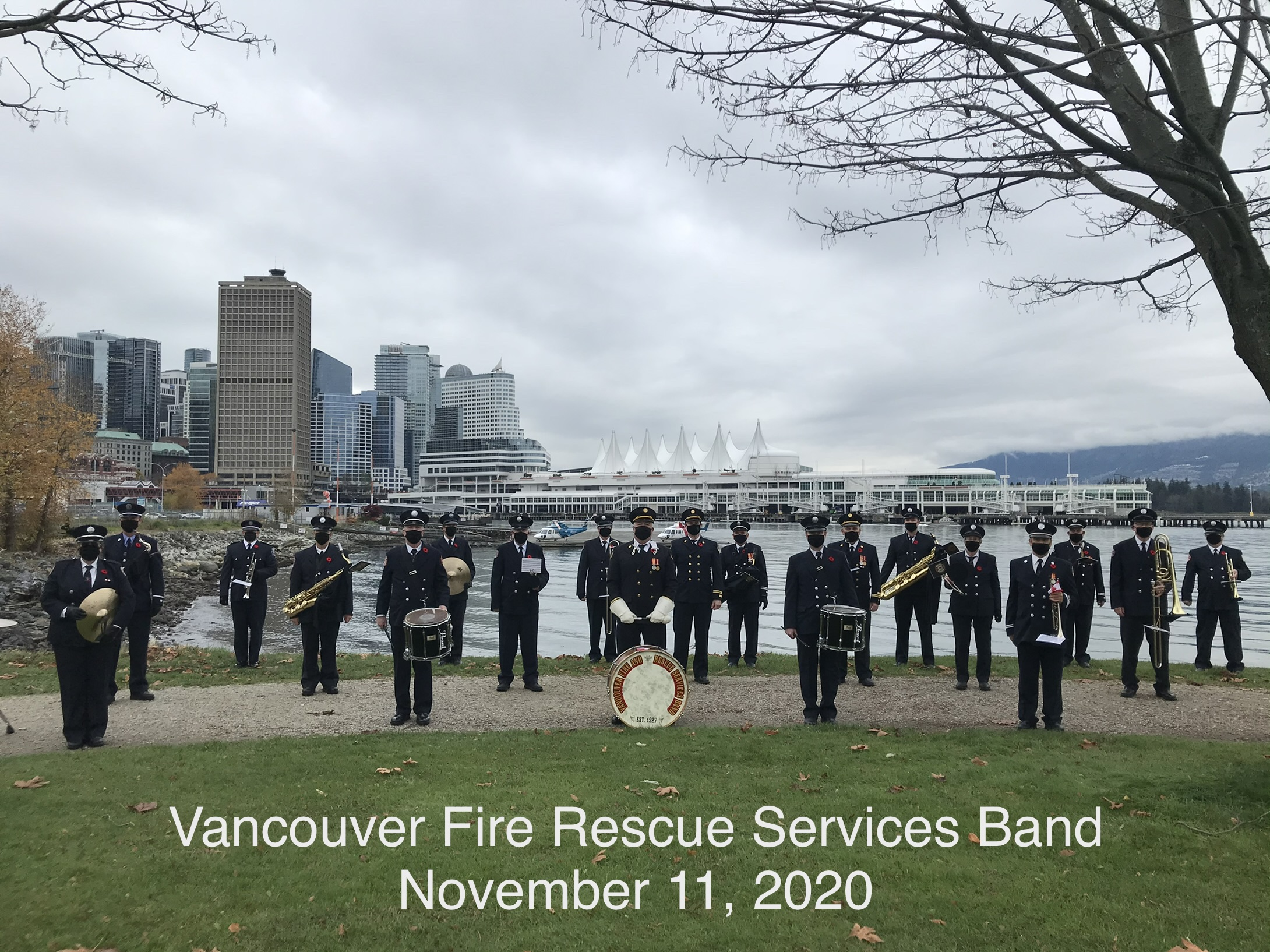
VFRS Band Remembrance Day 2020. Because of COVID restrictions, the band performed the ceremony remotely from Crab Park.

== See also ==
- E-Comm, 9-1-1 call and dispatch centre for Southwestern BC
- Vancouver Police Department
- British Columbia Ambulance Service
