= Bessie Brown =

American singer

Background information
- Also known as: "The Original" Bessie Brown; Sadie Green, Caroline Lee, and possibly Helen Richards
- Born: March 2, 1890; Marysville, Ohio, U.S.
- Died: November 12, 1955 (aged 65) Cleveland, Ohio, United States
- Genres: Jazz, classic female blues
- Occupation: Singer
- Instrument: Vocals
- Years active: 1920s and 1930s
- Labels: Pathé (1920s); Document (1990s compilation)

Bessie Brown (March 2, 1890 – November 12, 1955) also known as "The Original" Bessie Brown, was an American classic female blues, jazz, and cabaret singer. She sometimes recorded under the pseudonyms Sadie Green, Caroline Lee, and possibly Helen Richards. Brown was active as a recording artist from 1925 to 1929.

She should not be confused (although often is in biographies and discographies) with the Bessie Brown who recorded vaudeville and blues-styled duets with George W. Williams, over a similar timespan.

== Life and career ==
Brown was born in Marysville, Ohio. She recorded between November 10, 1925, and April 1, 1929. In her concurrent vaudeville career, she sometimes performed as a male impersonator. She also appeared in revues, including Moonshine Revue, The Whirl of Joy and Dark-Town Frolics, and on the stage as a cabaret performer, primarily on the East Coast. On her recordings she sang in a deepened tone, without any notable African-American dialect. Thus, to more than one commentator, her style was similar to that of Sophie Tucker.

On her recordings Brown was backed by some of the best Harlem-based musicians of the time, including Thomas Morris and Rex Stewart (cornet); Charlie Irvis and Charlie Green (trombone); Coleman Hawkins and Buster Bailey (saxophone); Buddy Christian and Clarence Holiday (banjo); and Porter Grainger, Clarence Williams and Fletcher Henderson (piano).

She left the music industry in 1932 and married Clarence Shaw in the early 1930s. She had one child, Helen Smith Mcreynolds, from her first marriage. Brown died of a heart attack, aged 65, in 1955.

The bulk of her known recorded work was issued as a compilation album, Complete Recorded Works (1925–29), by Document Records in 1996. The album also includes four October 1929 recordings by the unrelated comedian Eliza "Liza" Brown.
