= JHC =

JHC may refer to:

- JHC (Greek: ΙΗΣ), a Christogram
- Jaffna Hindu College, a boys' public national school in Jaffna, Sri Lanka
- Jesus H. Christ, an example of slang serving as a profanity
- Jesus Henry Christ, a 2012 comedy based on Dennis Lee's Student Academy Award-winning short film of the same name
- John Hancock Center, a 100-story, 1,127-foot tall skyscraper in Chicago, Illinois
- Joint Helicopter Command, a tri-service organisation uniting military helicopters of the British Armed Forces
- Journal of Higher Criticism, an academic journal
- Journal of Histochemistry and Cytochemistry, a peer-reviewed scientific journal of cell biology
- J.M. High Company
- J. H. Carlisle
- JAPW Heavyweight Championship
- JHC Avto
- JHC Bars
- JHC Reaktor
- JW Hunt Cup
- Jai Hind College
- JCW Heavyweight Championship
- JHC Spartak
- Järfälla HC, a hockey club in Järfälla, Sweden

== People ==
- James Henry Callander (1803–1851)
- J. Hinckley Clark (1830s–1880s)
- J. Harwood Cochrane (1912–2016)
- James Hodge Codding (1849–1919)
- James H. Cone (1936–2018)
- James H. Connors (died 1941)
- J. H. Conradie (1897–1966)
- James H. Conyers (1855–1935)
- James H. Coon (1914–1996)
- J. Harry Covington (1870–1942)
- James Henry Coyne (1849–1942)
- James Hoey Craigie (1870–1930)
- James H. Cromartie (born 1944)
- João Henrique Caldas, Brazilian politician and governor-elect of Alagoas
- John Horton Conway (1937–2020), English mathematician
- J. H. Cobbina, Ghanaian police officer
- Josh Harvey-Clemons (born 1994), American football player
