= David Campbell (1912 fireboat) =

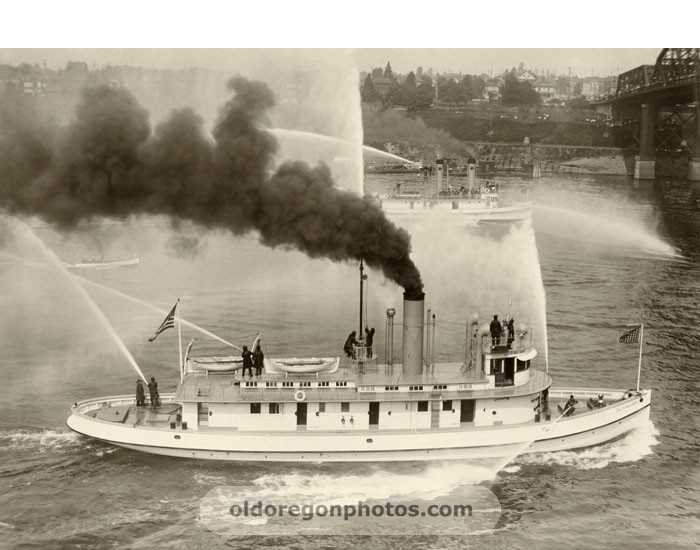
- David Campbell, George Williams, on the Willamette River.

History
- Name: David Campbell
- Namesake: David Campbell
- Owner: Portland Fire and Rescue (1912); Kanaga Ranching Company (1929); Petroleum Navigation Company (1932); Upper Columbia River Towing Company (1956); MV Express Inc (1962); John Clutter
- Builder: Johnston Brothers Company/Smith and Watson Ironworks
- Yard number: 52
- Completed: 1912
- Out of service: 1928
- Renamed: Chief (1927); Aleutian Native (1929); Express (1939)
- Identification: Call sign: WDJ9683; MMSI number: 369345000
- Status: in active service

General characteristics
- Tonnage: 242 grt (690 m^{3}) (originally); 99 grt (280 m^{3})
- Length: 125 ft (38 m) (originally); 118 ft (36 m)
- Beam: 27 ft (8.2 m)
- Draft: 9 ft (2.7 m)
- Installed power: 1,200 hp (890 kW) (originally)
- Propulsion: Twin steam Compound engines; 1710 V-12 Cummins 525hp naturally aspirated engines; 855 Cummins Big Cam turbo and aftercooled 400 hp diesel engines (2014)

The David Campbell was a fireboat built in 1912 for Oregon's Portland Fire and Rescue. She was a steam-powered vessel, built in a Michigan shipyard, disassembled, shipped in pieces, and reassembled in Portland. Her engines could develop 1,200 shaft horsepower (890 kW).

The David Campbell had two identical sister ships, the Mike Laudenklos and the Karl Gunster. Following her retirement, in 1928, the David Campbell was converted to a schooner, and remains afloat, in Alaska. She was replaced by another vessel, or the same name, that remained in use at least until 2012.

== See also ==
- Firefighting in Oregon
