= George G. Williams =

American academic (1902–2000)

George G. Williams (1 May 1902 - 1 December 2000) was professor emeritus of English and creative writing at Rice University. In 1996 he was named as a Rice distinguished alumnus.

Williams graduated from the Rice Institute with a BA in 1923 and subsequently completed his master's degree at the same institution. After an interlude teaching at New York University he returned to Rice, where he spent the rest of his career.

His Creative Writing for Advanced College Classes (1935) remained in print for almost 40 years and his novel The Blind Bull (1952) won first prize from the Texas Institute of Letters. His detailed Guide to Literary London (1973, 406 pages), which described 38 literary walks through the streets of London, was described as ambitious by Humphrey Higgins in the Journal of the Royal Society of Arts as to Williams, London was a foreign city.

Williams also wrote for academic journals on his hobby of ornithology and was one of the founders of the Houston Museum of Natural Science for which he was the first president from 1948 to 1950.

== Selected publications ==
- Creative Writing for Advanced College Classes, 1935.
- The Blind Bull, 1952.
- British Poems of the 19th Century, 1957.
- Geological Factors in the Distribution of American Birds: Evolutionary Aspects of Migration. University of California Press, 1958.
- Some of My Best Friends are Professors, 1958.
- A New View of Chaucer, 1965.
- Guide to Literary London, Batsford, London, 1973. (assisted by Marian and Geoffrey Williams) ISBN 0713401419
