= David Campbell Memorial =

Firefighting memorial in Portland, Oregon, U.S.

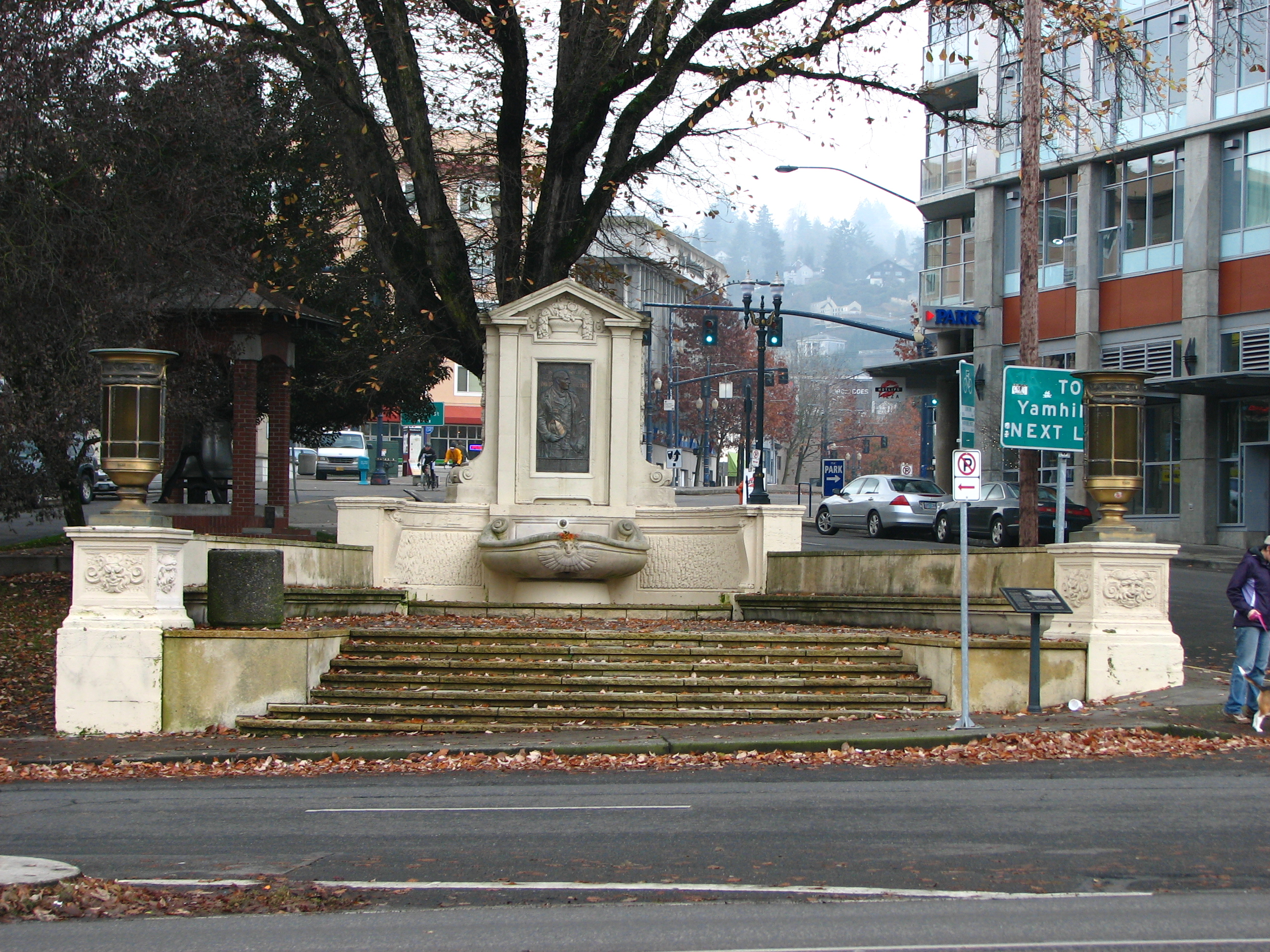
- The memorial in 2010
- Interactive map of David Campbell Memorial
- Type: Public park
- Location: Portland, Oregon, U.S.
- Coordinates: 45°31′22″N 122°41′24″W
- Operator: David Campbell Memorial Association
- Status: Open all year
- David Campbell Memorial
- U.S. National Register of Historic Places
- Built: 1928
- NRHP reference No.: 10000802
- Added to NRHP: September 24, 2010

The David Campbell Memorial, installed in an area known as Portland Firefighters Park, is a firefighter memorial in Portland, Oregon, United States. It was dedicated in 1928 in honor of Portland fire chief David Campbell.

== Description ==
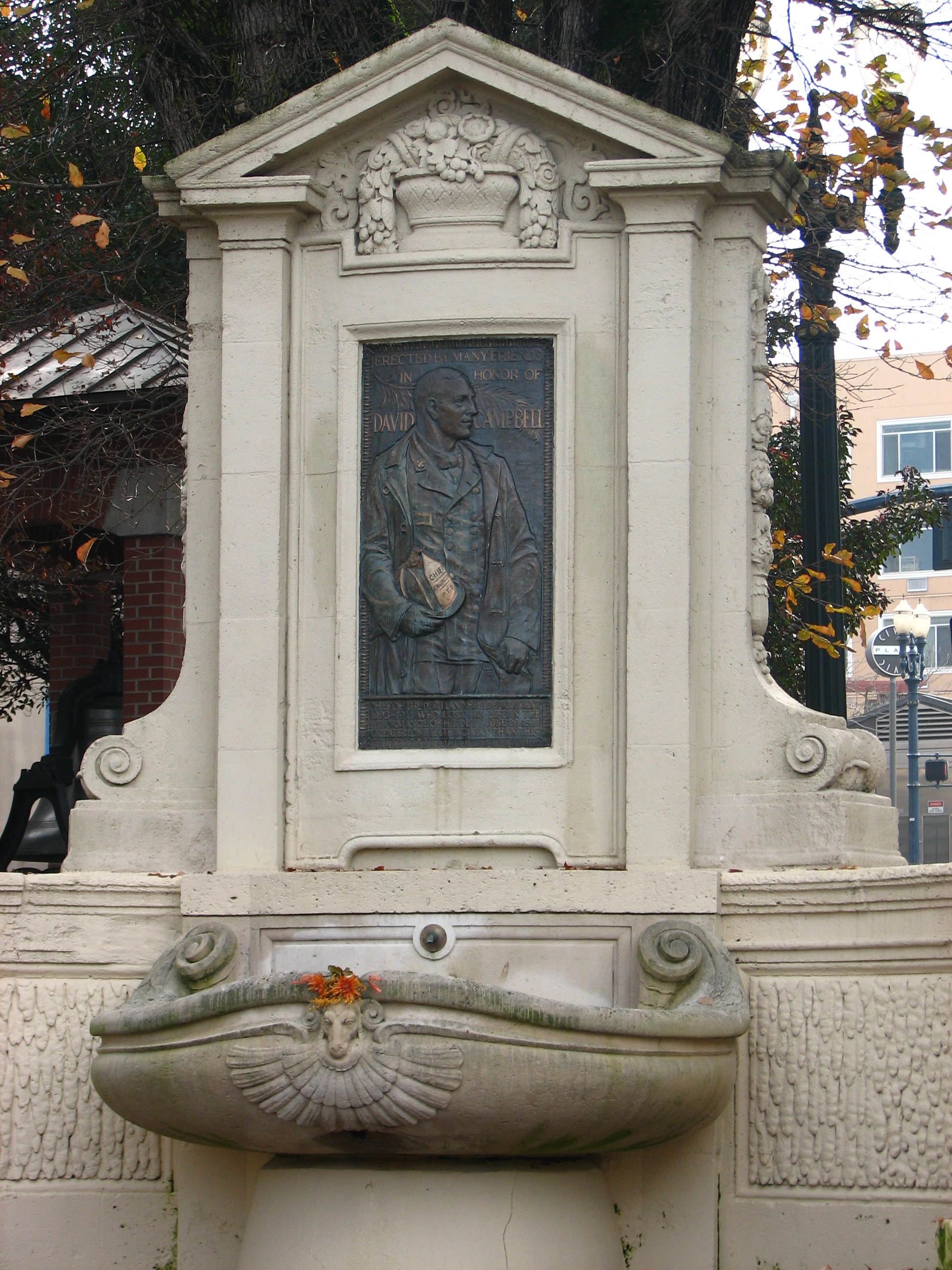
Detail of the memorial

The David Campbell Memorial is located in southwest Portland, Multnomah County, Oregon, in a triangular traffic island bordered by southwest Alder Street to the north, southwest 19th Avenue on the west, and southwest I8th Avenue on the east. The east half of the triangle includes a grassy area that is considered a non-contributing resource because it was constructed after the period of significance for the Memorial. The grassy area is sometimes referred to as Portland Firefighters Park. The triangular space in which the David Campbell Memorial and the park are situated is city right-of-way to the surrounding streets, so it was never platted or assigned a block number. It is owned by the city of Portland but is not maintained by Portland Parks and Recreation. Care is provided by the David Campbell Memorial Association.

The open end of the Memorial faces north. It includes a staircase leading to the floor. On either side of the convex staircase is a limestone pedestal with dadoes featuring carved, grotesque, humanoid faces with rams horns growing from their heads. On top of each pedestal are bronze lanterns with stylized classical ornamentation including bay-leaf garlands and pendant strings of bellflowers. They were provided by the Pennsylvania light fixture company Smyser-Royer.

Two stone benches, one on either side, lead to the head of the Memorial at the south point, which is punctuated by a fountain and pool beneath it. The fountain head features a bronze bas-relief of Fallen Fire Chief David Campbell. It shows David Campbell from the knees up, wearing his firefighting turnout coat and holding his helmet in his right hand. A single fern frond shows behind the profile of Campbell's head. The plaque is embossed with the words, "Chief of the Portland Fire Department 1893-1911 who lost his life in the performance of his duty June 26, 1911. 'Greater love hath no man than this."

Bronze plaques commemorating Portland's Fallen Firefighters are inlaid into the floor of the Memorial in front of the fountain. In the middle is a plaque that reads, "In memory of members of the Portland Fire Department who gave their lives in the performance of their duty."

== History ==
Portland fire chief David Campbell was killed on June 26, 1911, while responding to a fire at a Union Oil distribution plant. A memorial to Campbell, designed by Pennsylvania architect Paul Philippe Cret, began construction in 1927 and was dedicated in 1928.

The memorial was added to the National Register of Historic Places on September 24, 2010. It experienced several instances of vandalism in 2023, with multiple brass plaques honoring dead Portland firefighters being stolen. The location is described by the city as being frequented by drug dealers and homeless. As of 2024, the David Campbell Memorial Association was in talks with the City of Portland to raise funds to repair and upgrade the memorial.

== See also ==
- David Campbell (1912 fireboat)
- David Campbell (1927 fireboat)
- Firefighting in Oregon
- List of firefighting monuments and memorials
