= Fireboats of Vancouver =

Fireboats of Vancouver, British Columbia, Canada

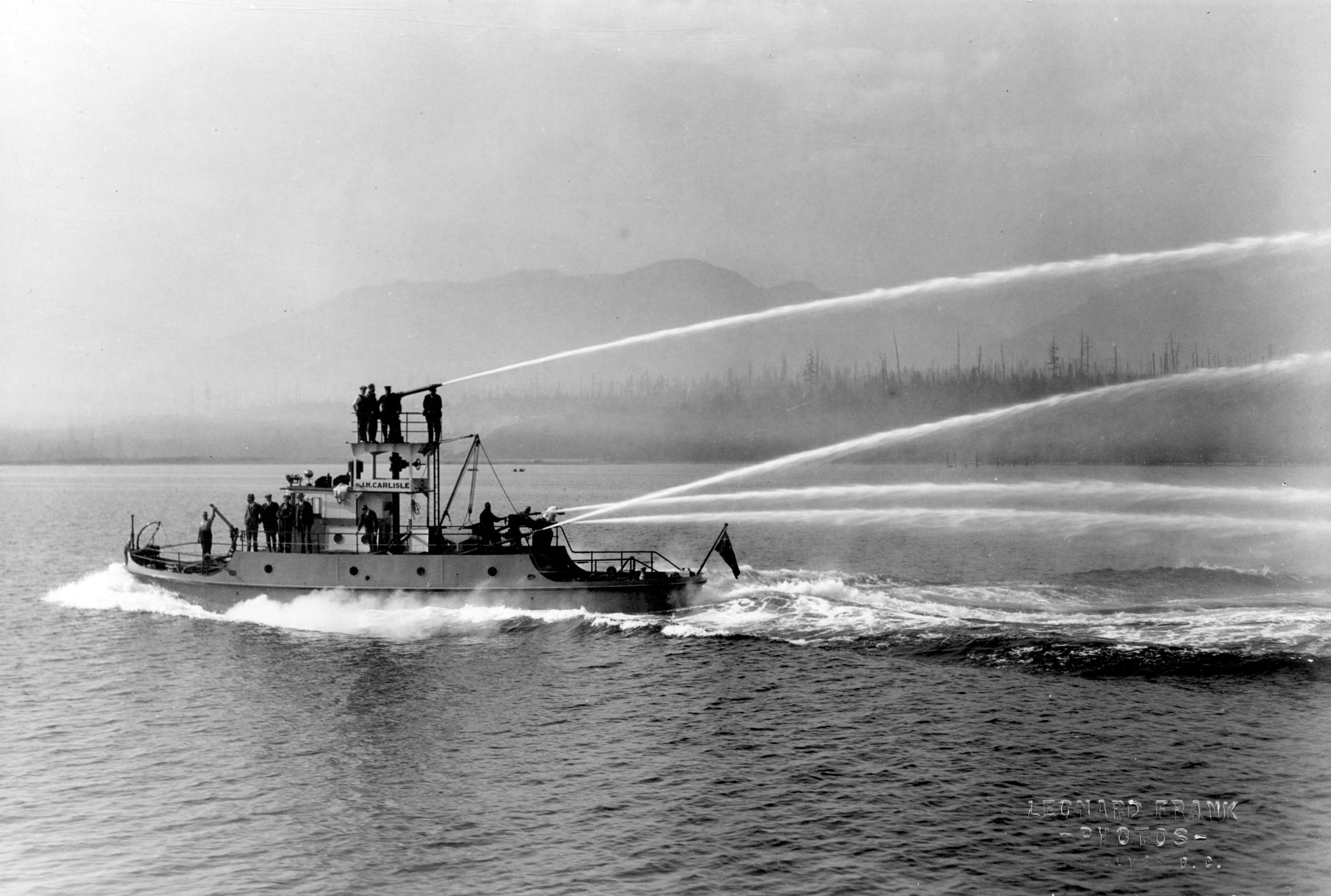
Fireboat J.H. Carlisle, 1928.

The city of Vancouver, British Columbia, has operated fireboats since 1928, when the city introduced the J.H. Carlisle.

The city has employed several fireboats since, with the present modern vessels, Fireboat 1 and Fireboat 2, having been introduced in 2016 and 2018 respectively.

== History ==
In the early 1920s, the shores of False Creek were lined with industrial facilities, mainly sawmills. The owners of these businesses committed to pay for the construction of a fireboat provided it would be stationed in False Creek, as the boat's presence reduced the cost of their fire insurance.

The new fireboat was named in honour of Vancouver's longest serving fire chief, John Howe Carlisle and based at Fire Hall No. 16 at the South end of Drake Street.

Acquired to supplement the Carlisle in 1946, were two war surplus landing barges. Fitted with twin water monitors, these vessels were stationed at Fire Hall No. 10 at the North end of Burrard Street.

In 1951, the city launched its second fireboat, Fireboat No. 2. At the time considered one of the most powerful in the world, this vessel was assigned to Fire Hall No. 10 to replace the two barges.

The J.H. Carlisle was retired in 1971, and Fire Hall No. 16 closed and demolished shortly thereafter. The vessel went on to be sold to the Gulf of Georgia Towing Co., doing service towing barges and log booms.

Fireboat No. 2 worked until 1987, at which time it was sold to the city of San Francisco. Renamed the Guardian, it was retired from this service in 2022.

Beginning in 1992, the city of Vancouver received five new fireboats. Designed by Robert Allan Ltd. and built by Celtic Shipyards, the new boats not only served Vancouver but operated throughout the Lower Mainland as part of a new consortium between the cities of Vancouver, Port Moody, Burnaby, and the city and district of North Vancouver.

By 2015, four of the 1992-built boats were still in service, but had exceeded their planned 20-year operational life. The vessels had such low pumping capacity that authorities would dispatch two boats to each fire. In 2016 it was announced that the city would receive two new fireboats built by MetalCraft Marine of Kingston, Ontario. The boats would replace three of the remaining 1992-built boats, while one would be kept as a reserve.

While the first of the new boats entered service in September 2016, the second boat caught fire during transport, delaying its delivery by several months. The fire on the second boat resulted in it being deemed a total loss, with a new boat being built to replace it. The replacement boat entered service in 2018.

== Notable events ==
On July 7, 1938, CPR Pier D caught fire. The J.H. Carlisle together with crews on land battled what was described as Vancouver's "most spectacular fire" for hours. At one point the heat grew so intense that four firefighters battling the blaze from a raft were forced to leap into the water after their hose was burned through.

On March 6, 1945, the freighter Greenhill Park exploded at a pier on Burrard Inlet. The blast killed 8 longshoremen, injured a further 19 and shattered windows across the city. With World War II still in its final stages, many initially thought the explosion was the result of a Japanese attack.

In 1959 the Norwegian freighter Ferngulf exploded in Burrard Inlet, killing two and seriously wounding several more. There was no intervention by the city's fireboats. An inquiry determined that the city's rules only allowed the fireboat to leave the city when directed to do so by the mayor. Changes were made, empowering a "rescue coordinator" to order rescue vessels to sea.

On July 3, 1960, a fire broke out at the BC Forrest Products Mill on the south shore of False Creek, resulting in Vancouver's first five-alarm fire. Battled by both the J.H. Carlisle and Fireboat No. 2, the fire was contained, although most of the mill was burnt down before it could be extinguished.

== List of Vancouver Fireboats ==
Image	Name	Built	Retired	Length	Pumping Capacity	Notes
	J.H. Carlisle	1928	1971	60 feet (18 m)	6,000 GPM	Retired and sold to Gulf of Georgia Towing Co.
	Fire Barge No. 1	1946	1951		500 GPM	Sold to City of New Westminster
	Fire Barge No. 2	1946	1951		500 GPM	Retired and Sold to Gulf of Georgia Towing Co.
	Fireboat No. 2	1951	1987	88 feet (27 m)	20,000 GPM	Sold to San Francisco in 1990
	Fireboat 1	1992	20--	40 feet (12 m)	2,000 GPM	
	Fireboat 2	1992	20--	40 feet (12 m)	2,000 GPM	
	Fireboat 3	1992	20--	40 feet (12 m)	2,000 GPM	
	Fireboat 4	1992	20--	40 feet (12 m)	2,000 GPM	
	Fireboat 5	1992	20--	40 feet (12 m)	2,000 GPM	
	Fireboat 1 (FB-1)	2016	present	43 feet (13 m)	7,500 GPM	
	Fireboat 2 (FB-2)	2018	present	43 feet (13 m)	7,500 GPM	
