= George Williams (footballer, born 1881) =

Australian rules footballer

Personal information
- Full name: George Williams
- Born: 10 February 1881
- Died: 13 May 1946 (aged 65)
- Original team: Williamstown

Playing career^{1}
Years	Club	Games (Goals)
1910	St Kilda	1 (0)
- ^{1} Playing statistics correct to the end of 1910.

George Williams (10 February 1881 – 13 May 1946) was an Australian rules footballer who played with St Kilda in the Victorian Football League (VFL).
