= George Williams (comedian) =

- Born: George Smith Williams; 25 May 1910; Liverpool, England
- Died: 23 April 1995 (aged 84); London
- Occupation: Comedian

George Smith Williams (25 May 1910 – 23 April 1995) was an English comedian, most popular between the 1930s and early 1950s.

== Biography ==
Born in Liverpool, the son of a farmer's daughter, he moved with his parents to Nottingham and then to Leicester as a child. He began performing on stage when young, sometimes improvising cleverly when he forgot his words, and in his teens joined local concert parties. In his early twenties he joined the army.

He made his professional debut in the early 1930s at a show in Accrington, and introduced what became his catchphrase in a show in which he played a hospital patient. When the doctor asked him what was wrong, Williams, with his face in white make-up, said in a quivering and lugubrious Lancastrian voice "I'm not well..", a line that won him applause. In later shows, he continued to use the line as an opening remark, followed by jokes such as "I keep having a going-off feeling coming on.. I said to the doctor, will you give me something for the wind? He gave me a kite". The lines "I'm not well... I'm proper poorly", were later used by fellow comedian Reg Dixon, and he and Williams disputed who was the originator.

During the Second World War, Williams joined ENSA, and appeared in many shows for the military. Known as a camp comedian, he developed a persona as a "soppy" soldier, with ill-fitting uniform and tin hat. After the war, he became a popular radio performer on shows such as Variety Bandbox and Workers' Playtime, and also appeared in pantomimes, often as Buttons.

His career was substantially ended when he was convicted of an illegal homosexual act in 1952. He was sentenced to two years imprisonment, and was dropped by the BBC and by the Moss Empires theatre circuit. He started to make a comeback in the late 1960s, appearing in venues such as The Establishment nightclub in Soho. He performed in theatre shows through the 1970s and 1980s, including charity shows for the Friends of the Greenwich Theatre and the Variety Artistes Ladies Guild, and in 1985 made a successful guest appearance at a gala show at the London Palladium.

He wrote an autobiography, Hang on a Tick, in 1992, with a preface by Marcel Marceau, who described Williams as "Britain’s most underrated comedian". A devout Quaker, George Williams died in London in 1995 at the age of 84. He was unmarried.
