= George Williams (American football) =

American football coach

Coaching career (HC unless noted)
- 1916: Kansas Wesleyan

Head coaching record
- Overall: 0–8

George Williams was an American football coach. As head coach of Kansas Wesleyan in 1916, his team failed to win a game. They gave up an average of just over 40 points per game while scoring only three points for the entire season.

== Coaching career ==
Williams was the sixth head football coach at Kansas Wesleyan University in Salina, Kansas and he held that position for the 1919 season. His coaching record at Kansas Wesleyan was 0–8 and his team was outscored 327–3 by opponents.

Date	Opponent	Score	Location	Notes
September 30, 1916	Fairmount	0–26	Salina, Kansas	
October 7, 1916	Baker	3–72	Baldwin City, Kansas	The only time the team scored in the entire season
October 13, 1816	Fort Hays State	0-20	Hays, Kansas	Part of the longest winning streak for Fort Hays State under coach W. G. Speer
October 20, 1916	Sterling	0–6	Salina, Kansas	The closest score of the season and only time opponents were held to single digits
November 3, 1916	Saint Mary's (KS)	0–64	Saint Mary's, Kansas	
date unknown	College of Emporia	0–27	unknown location	
November 25, 1916	Nebraska Wesleyan	0–91	Lincoln, Nebraska	Worst defeat of the season
November 30, 1916	Bethany (KS)	0–21	Salina, Kansas	

== Head coaching record ==
Year	Team	Overall	Conference	Standing	Bowl/playoffs
Kansas Wesleyan Coyotes (Kansas Collegiate Athletic Conference) (1916)
1916	Kansas Wesleyan	0–8	0–7	16th	
Kansas Wesleyan:		0–8	0–7		
Total:		0–8			
