= Humphrey Higgins =

British book editor and translator (1907–1984)

Humphrey Higgens (1907-1984) was a British book editor and translator who with Peter Fisher made the first complete English translation of Olaus Magnus's A Description of the Northern Peoples (Historia de Gentibus Septentrionalibus).

== Works ==
Higgins's translation from Russian of Ilya Ehrenburg's The Spring, which was the sequel to The Thaw, was published in New York in 1961. Both were republished by Knopf in the 1962 collection A Change of Season.

In 1968, Higgins's revised edition of Constance Garnett's 1924 translation of Alexander Herzen's memoirs My Past and Thoughts was published by Chatto and Windus in four volumes. Higgins made many amendments and reinstated passages suppressed in the original edition.

With Peter Fisher he made the first complete translation into English of Olaus Magnus's A Description of the Northern Peoples (Historia de Gentibus Septentrionalibus) (1555) which was published by the Hakluyt Society in three volumes between 1996 and 1998.

== Selected translations ==
- The Spring by Ilya Ehrenburg. MacGibbon & Kee, New York, 1961. (Republished in the collection A Change of Season in 1962.)
- My Past and Thoughts: The Memoirs of Alexander Herzen by Alexander Herzen. Chatto & Windus, London, 1968. (Four volumes) (Revised edition)
- Ends and Beginnings by Alexander Herzen. Oxford University Press, Oxford, 1985. (Revision of Constance Garnett's translation) ISBN 0192816047
- Olaus Magnus: A Description of the Northern Peoples, 1555 by Olaus Magnus. Hakluyt Society, London, 1996-98. (Three volumes) (With Peter Fisher)
