= George Williams (umpire) =

Umpire

Umpiring information
- Tests umpired: 1 (1958)
- Source: Cricinfo, 17 July 2013

George B. Williams was a former West Indian cricket umpire from Trinidad and Tobago. He stood in one Test match, West Indies vs. Pakistan, in 1958.

== See also ==
- List of Test cricket umpires
