= Buddy Christian =

American jazz musician

Narcisse J. "Buddy" Christian (1895? - 1958?) was an American jazz banjoist, guitarist, and pianist.

Christian worked professionally as a pianist starting in the early 1910s. He played in New Orleans with Peter Bocage in 1912-1913 and with King Oliver at Lala's Cafe in the middle of the decade. Around 1920 he moved to New York City, where he began playing banjo in addition to piano. He played with Lucille Hegamin, June Clark, and the Red Onion Jazz Babies, and played in the studio on Clarence Williams's sessions, including Eva Taylor and the Blue Five (with Louis Armstrong and Sidney Bechet). He can also be heard on Bessie Smith recordings made in 1923.

In 1926, he recorded under his own name, and continued working as a session musician for recordings with Charles Matson, New Orleans Willie Jackson, and blues musicians. He and Fred Jennings played in a banjo duo in 1929. After 1930 Christian left active performance.
