= Eldon Trinity =

Fireboat in Portland, Oregon, U.S.

The Eldon Trinity is a fireboat operated in Portland, Oregon, United States, by the Portland Fire Bureau. She was launched in 2010. She is named after two children, Eldon and Trinity Smith, whose mother threw them off a bridge into Portland's Willamette River. Authorities recognized that the attempts to rescue the children exposed weaknesses in the city's rescue infrastructure. Eldon died, while his older sister Trinity survived.

Bystanders drew the children from the water, but the Fire Bureau vessel sent to provide medical care, the powerful David Campbell, built in 1928, was slow to arrive, taking 44 minutes.

The Eldon Trinity cost $400,000. Eight-year-old Trinity delivered a speech during the commissioning.

In 2013 a floating boathouse was built to service and store the Eldon Trinity.

== Operational history ==
The Eldon Trinity went out on its first operational call only two hours after her commissioning.

On February 22, 2012, firefighters using the Eldon Trinity rescued a man who had fallen into the swiftly flowing Willamette River, near the vessel's mooring. He was rescued within eight minutes. Tom Williams, Portland's Fire Chief, called it "one of the fastest water rescues I have ever seen."

== See also ==
- Firefighting in Oregon
