= George Williams (cricketer) =

English cricketer

Personal information
- Full name: George Edward Williams
- Born: 13 August 1875; Oxford, Oxfordshire, England
- Died: 4 March 1952 (aged 76); Southsea, Hampshire, England

Domestic team information
- Years: Team
- 1904: Hampshire
- 1908–1909: Berkshire

Career statistics
Competition	First-class
Matches	1
Runs scored	16
Batting average	8.00
100s/50s	0/0
Top score	15
Catches/stumpings	0/–
- Source: Cricinfo, 6 January 2009

George Edward Williams (13 August 1875 — 4 March 1952) was an English first-class cricketer.

Williams was born at Oxford in August 1875. He made a single appearance in first-class cricket for Hampshire against Somerset at Taunton. Batting twice in the match, he was run out for 15 in Hampshire's first innings, while in their second he was run out for a single run. He later played minor counties cricket for Berkshire in 1908 and 1909, making five appearances in the Minor Counties Championship. Outside of cricket, Williams was the manager of the Aldershot Theatre. He divorced his wife in 1906, following her adulterous affair with an Aldershot-based lieutenant. Williams died at Southsea in March 1952.
