= J. H. Carlisle =

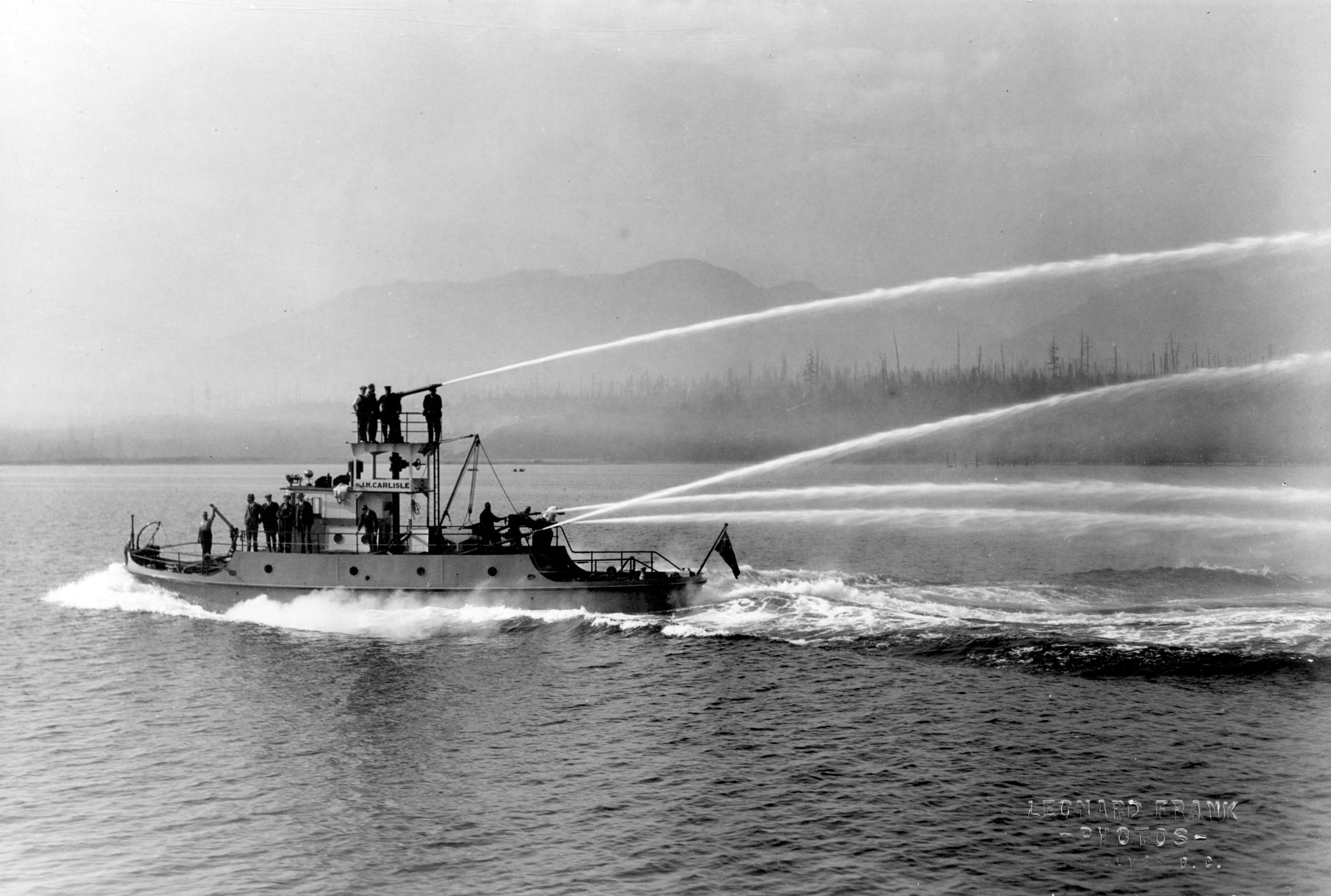
The fireboat J.H. Carlisle, 1928.

The J. H. Carlisle was a fireboat that operated in Vancouver, British Columbia from 1928 through 1971. It was named for Vancouver's longest serving fire chief, John Howe Carlisle. He was appointed Vancouver's fire chief in 1886, serving in the position for 42 years.

== Service life ==
At the time of the boat's commissioning, the shores of False Creek where lined with many industrial sites. The owners of these committed to pay for the construction of a fireboat provided it would be permanently stationed in the creek, as its presence reduced the cost of their fire insurance. The Carlisle was launched in 1928 and served the city until the early 1970s, after her retirement the city received bids for her purchase from around the world.

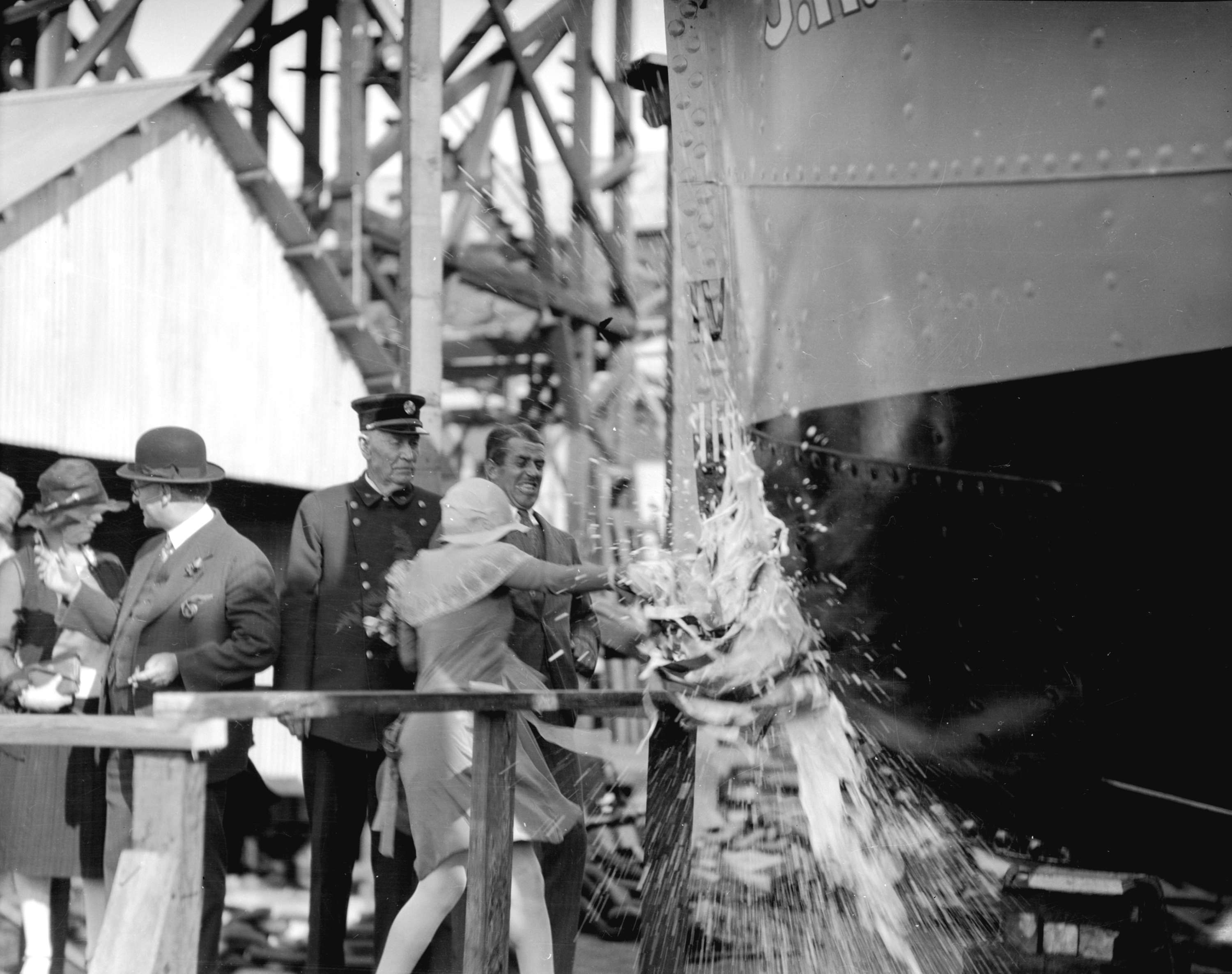
The J.H. Carlisle is christened by Miss Iris Gibbens in 1928. The boat's namesake, Chief Carlisle, is standing just to her left.

== Design and Equipment ==
The vessel was designed with a steel hull and powered by several gasoline engines. The vessel was equipped three main water monitors, two on her main deck, one forward and one aft, with her most powerful one situated on an elevated platform amidships.

== Notable Events ==
On July 7, 1938 CPR Pier D caught fire. The J.H. Carlisle together with crews on land battled what was described as Vancouver's "most spectacular fire" for hours. At one point the heat grew so intense that four firefighters battling the blaze from a raft where forced to leap into the water after their hose was burned through.

On July 3, 1960, a fire broke out at the BC Forest Products Mill on the South shore of False Creek, resulting in Vancouver's first five-alarm fire. The fire was contained, although most of the mill was burnt down before it could be extinguished.

== See also ==
- Fireboats of Vancouver
