= George Williams (footballer, born 1882) =

English footballer

Personal information
- Full name: George Williams
- Date of birth: 1882
- Place of birth: Wolverhampton, England
- Date of death: 1939 (aged 56–57)
- Position: Wing half

Senior career*
Years	Team	Apps	(Gls)
1903–1904	Blakenhall		
1904–1906	Wolverhampton Wanderers	46	(0)
1906	Tettenhall Rovers		
Total		46	(0)
- * Club domestic league appearances and goals

George Williams (1882–1939) was an English footballer who played in the Football League for Wolverhampton Wanderers.
