= Fireboats of Jacksonville, Florida =

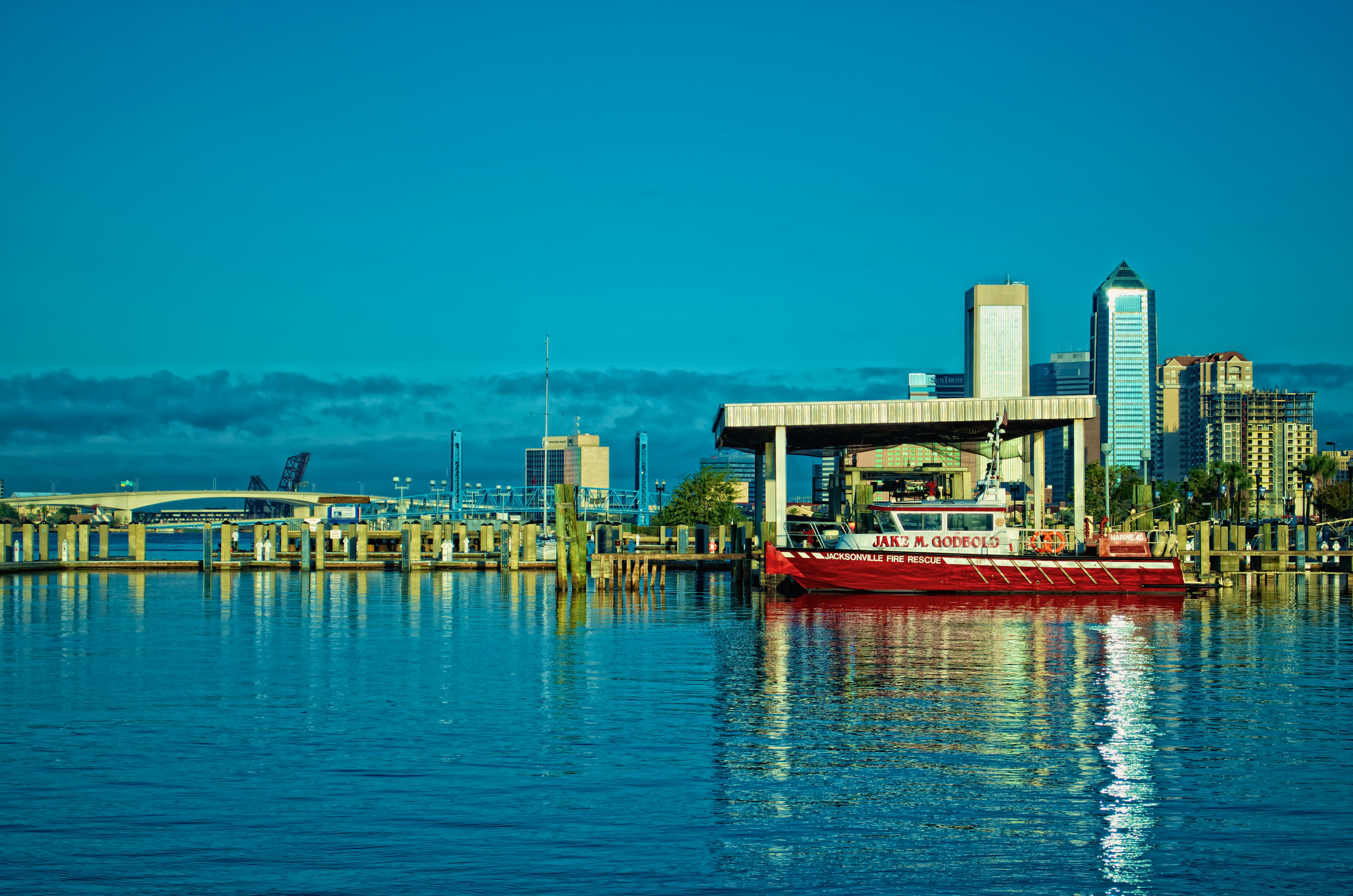
The Jake M. Godbold moored on the St Johns River in Jacksonville.

Jacksonville, Florida has operated Fireboats, including a fleet of three fireboats from 1999 to 2001, according to the Federal Emergency Management Agency (FEMA). While other cities require the master, at most, to be US Coast Guard certified, Jacksonville requires all crew members to be certified capable of serving as the master of a vessel of up to 100 tons.

During the 1999–2001 period, Jacksonville fireboats were called for water rescues on 486 occasions. They were called to fight fires 193 times.

In 1922 the city commissioned the John C. Callahan as its first fireboat.

fireboats in Jacksonville have included:
John C. Callahan	1922	1963	Converted from a World War I 110 foot subchaser.
Richard D. Sutton	1951	1971	
Eugene Johnson	1971		named after a firefighter who died in the line of duty.
Jax No. 1	1972		Converted tugboat.
Jake M. Godbold	2007		Propelled by waterjets.
Marine 39	2018		37 foot MetalCraft Marine Landing Craft Vessel; Twin Outboard 350 HP 4 Stroke engines; 2000 GPM Elkhart Monitor
