= George Williams (footballer, born 1862) =

Welsh footballer

Personal information
- Date of birth: 1862
- Place of birth: Wales

Senior career*
Years	Team	Apps	(Gls)
- Chirk

International career
1893–1898	Wales	6	(0)
- * Club domestic league appearances and goals

George Williams (1862–?) was a Welsh international footballer. He was part of the Wales national football team between 1893 and 1898, playing 6 matches. He played his first match on 18 March 1893 against Scotland and his last match on 19 February 1898 against Ireland. At club level, he played for Chirk.

== See also ==
- List of Wales international footballers (alphabetical)
