= Karl Prehn =

American fireboat

The Karl Prehn was a fireboat acquired by the Portland Fire Bureau in Portland, Oregon, in 1973.

She was added to the Bureau's fleet not long after the Police Bureau's responsibility for patrolling the harbor was transferred to the Fire Bureau.

But, in 1984, the vessel was made available to the city of Lewiston, Idaho. By 1994 Lewiston had purchased the vessel, and was considering retiring her, and replacing her with a more modern vessel. She was retired in early 1995.

The ship was named after a former Portland harbormaster, who also in charge of the Mulkey, a harbor patrol vessel.

== See also ==
- Firefighting in Oregon
