= CPR Pier D =

Port facility in Vancouver, Canada

Coordinates: 49.2868°N 123.1102°W

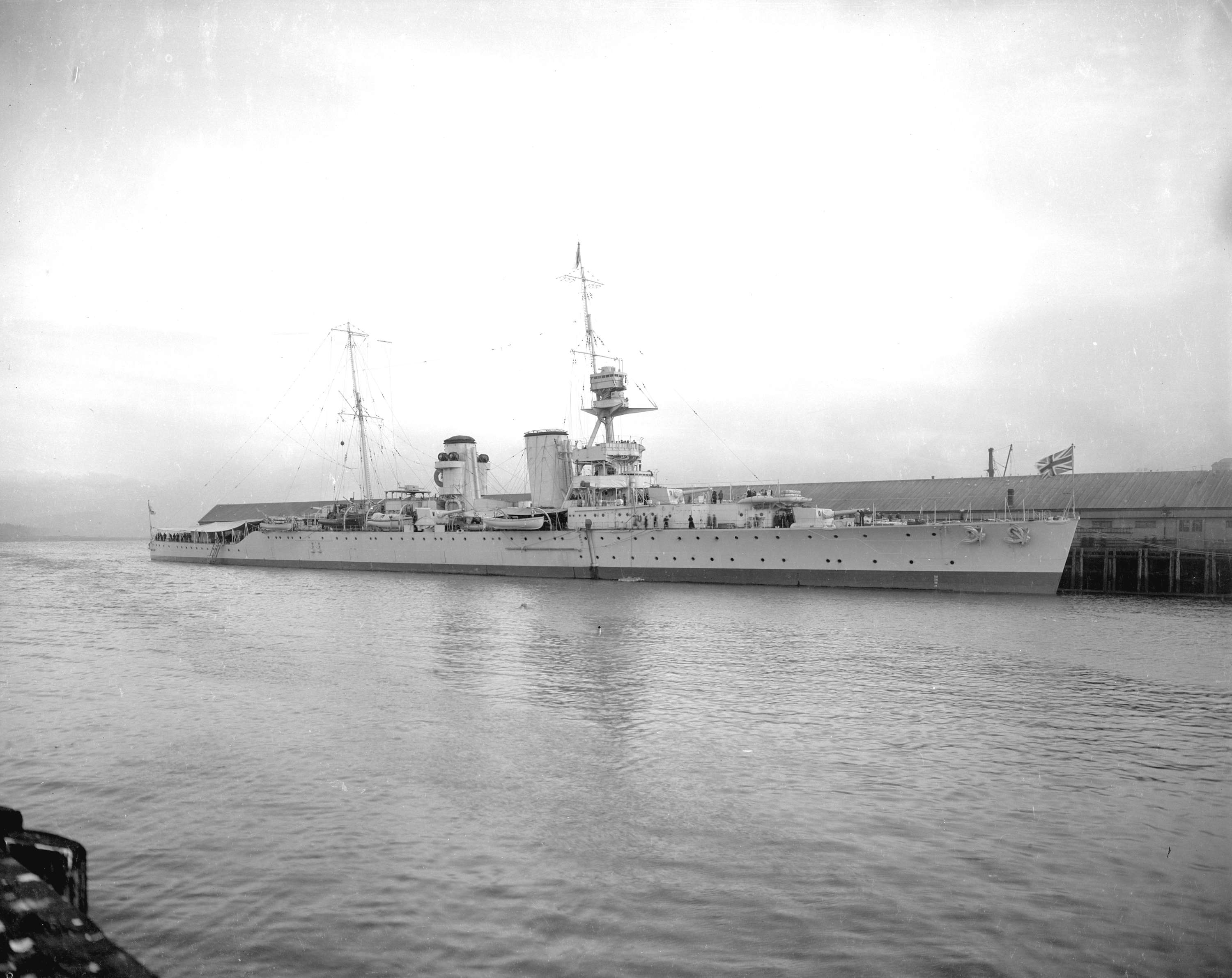
HMS Raleigh (1919) at Pier D in 1921

Pier D was a pier on the waterfront of Vancouver, Canada, built by the Canadian Pacific Railway. It was extended in 1916, with CPR committing $700,000 to the project, including $150,000 in what was described as "the largest piling contract ever given on the Pacific coast".

The pier was burned to the ground on July 27, 1938, with losses assessed at $1,000,000.
