= George Williams and Bessie Brown =

American singing and comedy duo

George W. Williams was an American vaudeville performer and recording artist. He recorded several songs with Bessie Brown (c. 1895 – 1964), who was his wife. They were one of the comedy duos on the TOBA circuit.

At a 1924 performance at the Strand Theater in Jacksonville, Florida, they sang inside a prop graphophone. Bessie Brown died in Cincinnati, Ohio, in 1964.

Brown is not to be confused with another Bessie Brown (March 2, 1890 – November 12, 1955), also known as "The Original" Bessie Brown, who was an American classic female blues, jazz, and cabaret singer.

== Discography ==
=== Songs ===
- "Double Crossin' Daddy"
- "She's My Sheba, I'm Her Sheik"
- "No Second-Handed Lovin' For Mine"
- "If You Hit My Dog I'll Kick Your Cat"
- "If Mama Quits Papa, What Will Papa Do?"
- "The Gal Ain't Born Who Can Treat Me Like You Do"
- "He's Never Gonna Throw Me Down"
- "Hoodoo Blues"
- "When You Go Huntin', I'm Goin' Fishin'"
- "I Can Do What You Do"
- "Hard Headed Gal"
- "A Woman Gets Tired Of One Man All The Time"
- "I'm Goin' Out Tonight And Strut My Stuff"
- "I'm Tired Of Begging You To Treat Me Right"
- "Mississippi Delta Blues"
- "Papa, Don't You Mean Your Mama No Good?"
- "Pork Chop Blues"
- "It Takes A Brownskin Man To Make A High"
- "Yellow Blue"
- "Scat! Mr. Sweetback"
- "You Need Some Lovin'"
- "How Can I Get It (When You Keep On Snatchin' It Back)"
- "I Won't Stand No Leavin' Now"
- "You Ain't Quittin' Me Without Two Weeks' Notice"
- "Chain Gang Blues"
- "Satisfied Blues"
- "I'm Gonna Kill Myself"
- "West Virginia Blues"
- "Sweet Mandy"
- "That Same Cat"
- "I'm Done"
- "I Don't Care What You Say"
- "Bootlegger's Ball"
- "When I Get The Devil In Me"
- "What Makes Papa Hate Mama So?"
- "You Can't Proposition Me"
- "Yodelin' The Blues Away"
- "Oh! Dark Gal"
- "Bald-Headed Mamma Blues"
- "Hit Me But Don't Quit Me"
- "Who Calls You Sweet Mama Now"
- "Some Baby, My Gal"
- "Levee Blues"
- "It Ain't A Doggone Thing But The Blues"
- "Cheatin' Blues"
- "Toodle-Oodle-Ooo"
- "Hymn Singing Bill"
- "He's Tight Like That"
- "Just Too Bad"

=== Compilation albums ===
- George Williams and Bessie Brown Volume I: 1923-1925 compilation album
- George Williams and Bessie Brown Volume II: 1925-1930
