= David Campbell (1927 fireboat) =

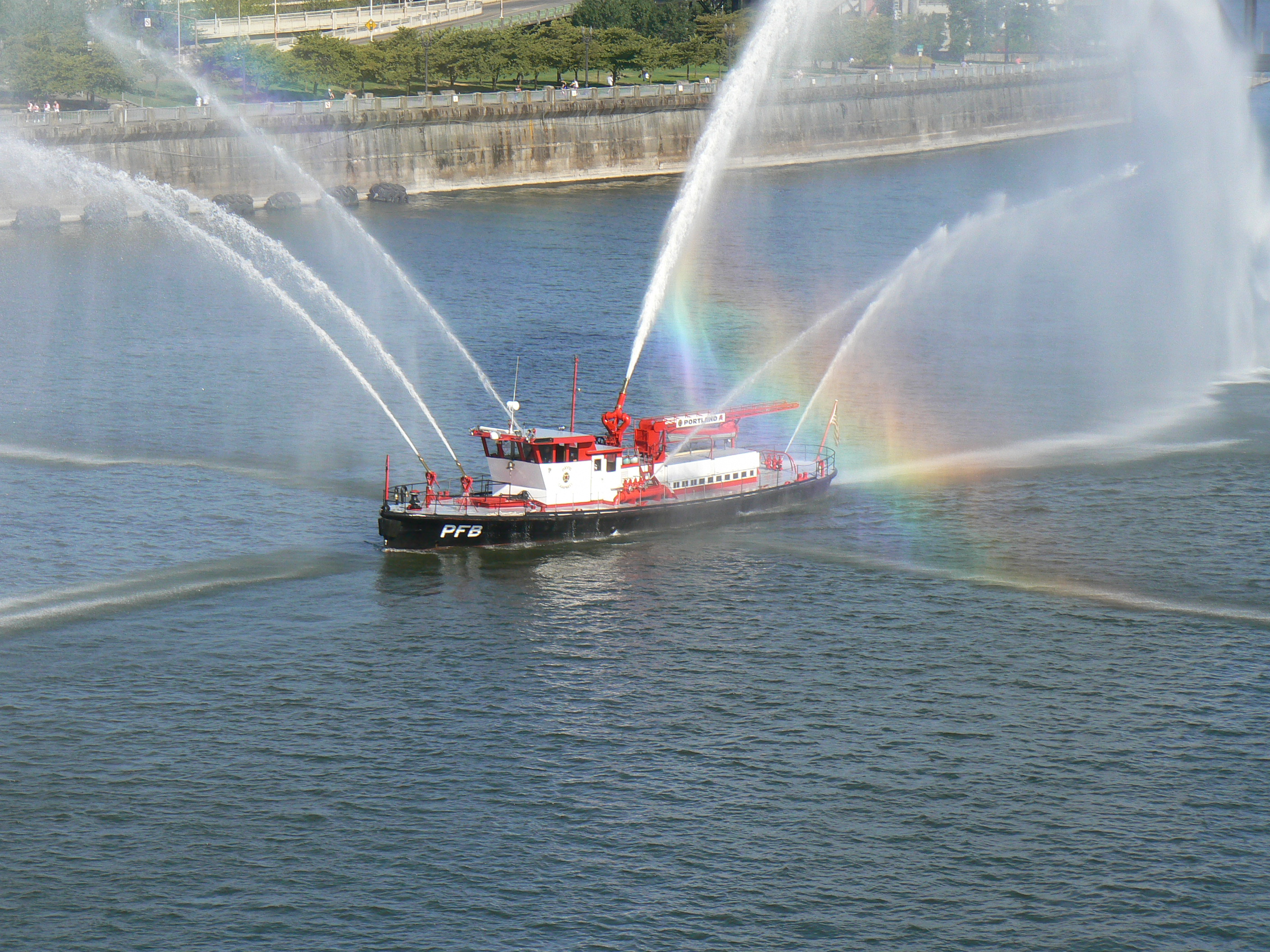
- David Campbell in 2006

History
- Name: David Campell
- Namesake: David Campbell
- Owner: Portland Fire & Rescue
- Builder: Baker Construction Company
- Cost: $103,615
- Completed: 1928
- Out of service: 2012
- Nickname(s): Fireboat 6

General characteristics
- Type: Fireboat
- Tonnage: 80.5 grt (228 m^{3})
- Length: 87.5 ft (26.7 m)
- Beam: 20.5 ft (6.2 m)
- Draft: 7.5 ft (2.3 m)
- Propulsion: Two V12 525M Cummins Diesels with twin screws

The David Campbell was a long-serving fireboat built in 1928 for Oregon's Portland Fire & Rescue. She underwent an extensive rebuild, in 1976. In 2010 Portland acquired a new smaller, faster fireboat, the Eldon Trinity, named after the two children who were thrown off the Sellwood Bridge in 2009, when it took the David Campbell 44 minutes to get to scene to provide medical care.

The David Campbell had two identical sister ships, the Mike Laudenklos and the Karl Gunster. The David Campbell remained in operation as late as 2012.

== See also ==
- Firefighting in Oregon
