= List of Kansas Wesleyan Coyotes head football coaches =

The Kansas Wesleyan Coyotes program is a college football team that represents Kansas Wesleyan University in the Kansas Collegiate Athletic Conference, a part of the NAIA. The team has had 20 head coaches since its first recorded football game in 1903. The current coach is Myers Hendrickson, who assumed the role in early 2019. Hendrickson had been an assistant under the previous head coach Matt Drinkall who was hired in January 2014. Drinkall replaced coach Dave Dallas who first took the position for the 1997 season and resigned at the end of the 2013 season.

== Key ==
Key to symbols in coaches list
General		Overall		Conference		Postseason (Note: Although the first Rose Bowl Game was played in 1902, it has been continuously played since the 1916 game, and is recognized as the oldest bowl game by the NCAA. "—" indicates any season prior to 1916 when postseason games were not played.)	
No.	Order of coaches (Note: A running total of the number of head coaches, with coaches who served separate tenures being counted only once. Interim head coaches are represented with "Int" and are not counted in the running total. "—" indicates the team played but either without a coach or no coach is on record. "X" indicates an interim year without play.)	GC	Games coached	CW	Conference wins	PW	Postseason wins
DC	Division championships	OW	Overall wins	CL	Conference losses	PL	Postseason losses
CC	Conference championships	OL	Overall losses	CT	Conference ties	PT	Postseason ties
NC	National championships	OT	Overall ties (Note: Overtime rules in college football were introduced in 1996, making ties impossible in the period since.)	C%	Conference winning percentage		
†	Elected to the College Football Hall of Fame	O%	Overall winning percentage (Note: When computing the win–loss percentage, a tie counts as half a win and half a loss.)				

== Coaches ==
No.	Name	Term	GC	OW	OL	OT	O%	CW	CL	CT	C%	PW	PL	CCs	Awards
0	No coach	1893, 1899–1902	9	4	5	0	.444	—	—	—	—	—	—	—	—
X	No team	1894–1898	—	—	—	—	—	—	—	—	—	—	—	—	—
1	Albert B. Cowden	1903, 1905	10	6	4	0	.600	—	—	—	—	—	—	—	—
X	No team	1904	—	—	—	—	—	—	—	—	—	—	—	—	—
2	George Miller	1906	1	0	1	0	.000	—	—	—	—	—	—	—	—
3	C. L. Williams	1908–1909	14	9	5	0	.643	—	—	—	—	—	—	—	—
X	No team	1910–1913	—	—	—	—	—	—	—	—	—	—	—	—	—
4	George R. Edwards	1914, 1917	15	4	11	0	.267	—	—	—	—	—	—	—	—
5	W. F. Ragle	1915	9	5	4	0	.556	—	—	—	—	—	—	—	—
6	George Williams	1916	8	0	8	0	.000	—	—	—	—	—	—	—	—
X	No team	1918	—	—	—	—	—	—	—	—	—	—	—	—	—
7	Ernest C. Quigley	1919	1	0	1	0	.000	—	—	—	—	—	—	—	—
8	J. Elwood Davis	1920	3	0	1	2	.333	—	—	—	—	—	—	—	—
9	Alexander Brown Mackie	1921–1937	126	73	40	13	.631	—	—	—	—	—	—	—	—
10	Gene Johnson	1938–1942	44	19	16	9	.534	—	—	—	—	—	—	—	—
X	No Team	1943–1945	—	—	—	—	—	—	—	—	—	—	—	—	—
11	Virgil Baer	1946–1948	27	12	12	3	.500	—	—	—	—	—	—	—	—
12	Wally A. Forsberg	1949–1951	28	11	16	1	.411	—	—	—	—	—	—	—	—
13	Gene Bissell	1952–1961; 1963–1978	162	76	81	5	.485	—	—	—	—	—	—	—	—
14	Daffin Backstrom	1962	9	1	7	1	.167	—	—	—	—	—	—	—	—
15	Ron Dupree	1979–1980; 1996	29	11	18	0	.379	—	—	—	—	—	—	—	—
16	Jon Bingesser	1981–1984	40	13	26	1	.338	—	—	—	—	—	—	—	—
17	Jack Welch	1985–1986	20	8	12	0	.400	—	—	—	—	—	—	—	—
18	Brad Jenkins	1987–1995	89	49	40	0	.551	—	—	—	—	—	—	—	—
19	Dave Dallas	1997–2013	175	94	81	0	.537	—	—	—	—	—	—	—	—
20	Matt Drinkall	2014–2018	59	42	17	—	.712	—	—	—	—	—	—	—	—
21	Myers Hendrickson	2019–2021	35	31	4	—	.886	—	—	—	—	—	—	—	—
22	Matt Myers	2022–present	22	16	6	—	.727	—	—	—	—	—	—	—	—

== See also ==
- List of people from Salina, Kansas
