= List of people from Salina, Kansas =

The list of people from Salina, Kansas includes only notable people who have resided in Salina, Kansas and who currently have a Wikipedia article.

== Academia ==
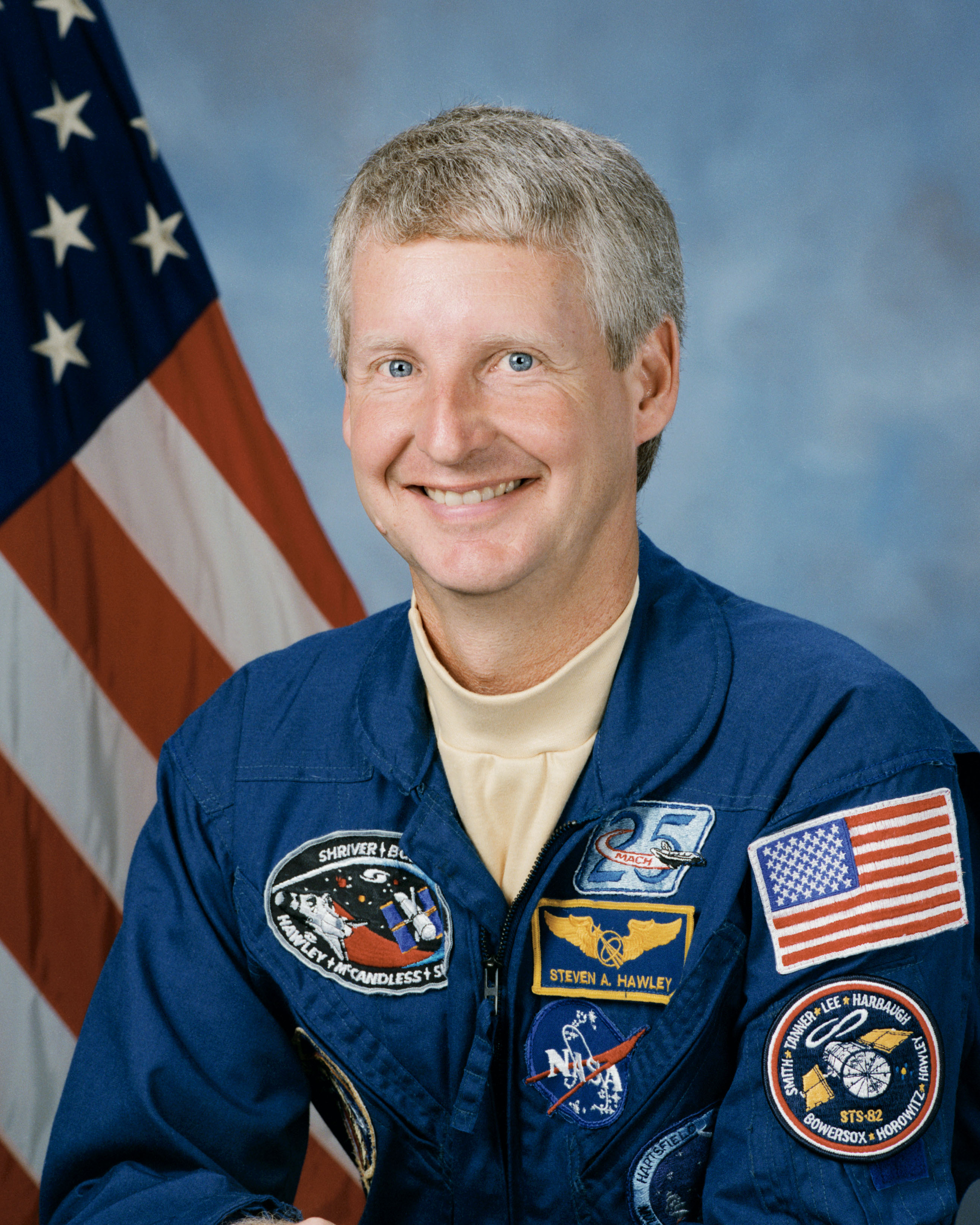
Salina native Steven Hawley was a mission specialist on five NASA mission flights.

- Alexander Brown Mackie (1894–1966), co-founder of Brown Mackie College
- Kenneth S. Davis (1912–1999), historian
- Steven Hawley (1951– ), astronaut, physics professor
- Wes Jackson (1936– ), environmentalist, plant geneticist
- Breon Mitchell (1942– ), literary translator, professor of Germanic studies

== Arts and entertainment ==
=== Film, television, and theater ===
- Tyrees Allen (1954– ), actor
- Dwight Frye (1899–1943), actor
- Otto Hulett (1898–1983), actor
- Betty Knox (1906–1963), dancer with Wilson, Keppel and Betty; war correspondent
- George Murdock (1930–2012), actor
- Nathan Tysen (1977– ), Broadway lyricist

=== Journalism ===
- Thomas Craven (1888–1969), writer, critic, and art historian
- Paul Harvey (1918–2009), radio broadcaster
- Laura M. Johns (1849–1935), suffragist, journalist
- Vera Brady Shipman (1889–1932), arts journalist, composer, clubwoman
- Gene Wojciechowski, sports journalist, author

=== Music ===
- Herbie Harper (1920–2012), jazz trombonist
- Terry Kirkman (1939–2023), singer/songwriter of The Association
- Charlie LaVere (1910–1983), jazz pianist and bandleader

=== Other visual arts ===
- Evan Lindquist (1936–2023), artist, printmaker, and Artist Laureate of the State of Arkansas

== Business ==
- Harry Lee, founder of the HD Lee Mercantile Company, inventor of Lee Jeans
- Matthew Rose (1959– ), railroad executive
- Roy Applequist (1946– ), 2010 Kansas Business Hall of Fame honoree and founder of Great Plains Manufacturing.

== Military ==
- Mary Ann Bickerdyke (1817–1901), American Civil War nurse

== Politics ==
=== National ===
- Joseph L. Bristow (1861–1944), U.S. Senator from Kansas
- Marlin Fitzwater (1942– ), White House Press Secretary
- Dean M. Gillespie (1884–1949), U.S. Representative from Colorado
- Guy T. Helvering (1878–1946), U.S. Representative from Kansas
- Tracey Mann (1976– ), U.S. Representative from Kansas
- Robert Hugh McWilliams, Jr. (1916–2013), United States federal judge
- William A. Phillips (1824–1893), city founder, U.S. Representative from Kansas
- Joseph Taggart (1867–1938), U.S. Representative from Kansas

=== State ===
- John W. Carlin (1940– ), 40th Governor of Kansas
- Bill Graves (1953– ), 43rd Governor of Kansas
- John F. Hayes (1919–2010), Kansas state legislator
- Dan G. Johnson, Idaho state legislator
- Lawton Nuss (1952– ), Kansas Supreme Court Chief Justice
- Clarke Sanders, Kansas state legislator and radio personality
- Shane Schoeller (1971– ), Missouri state legislator
- John Simpson (1934– ), Kansas State Senator and candidate for U.S. Senate
- Ernest Strahan (1901–1971), Kansas State Senator

== Religion ==
- John Balthasar Brungardt (1958– ), Bishop in the Catholic Church
- Frederick William Freking (1913–1998), Bishop in the Catholic Church
- Ashley Null, Anglican theologian

== Sports ==
=== American football ===
- Terence Newman (1978– ), NFL cornerback
- Brent Venables (1970– ), University of Oklahoma Head Coach
- Sheahon Zenger (1966– ), assistant coach, university sports administrator

=== Baseball ===
- Bob Cain (1924–1997), pitcher
- Luke French (1985– ), pitcher
- Ryan Kohlmeier (1977– ), pitcher
- Gene Mauch (1925–2005), infielder, manager
- Pat Meares (1968– ), shortstop
- Ernest C. Quigley (1880–1960), umpire
- Bob Swift (1915–1966), manager

=== Basketball ===
- Kurt Budke (1961–2011), women's college basketball coach
- Howard Engleman (1919–2011), college basketball standout
- Todd Jadlow, basketball player
- Gene Johnson (1902–1989), assistant coach, 1932 USA Olympic basketball gold medal team

=== Other sports ===
- Ethan Bandré (1998– ), soccer player
- Adrianna Franch (1990– ), soccer player
- Steve Fritz (1967– ), decathlete
- Jeremy Petty (1982– ), auto racer

== See also ==
- Lists of people from Kansas
