= Yadira Toraya =

American-born Mexican footballer (born 1991)

Personal information
- Full name: Yadira Toraya Guerrero
- Date of birth: 8 November 1991 (age 34)
- Place of birth: Oxnard, California, U.S.
- Height: 1.62 m (5 ft 4 in)
- Position: Left-back

Youth career
- Pacifica High School

College career
Years	Team	Apps	(Gls)
2009–2010	Ventura College		
2011–2012	Kansas Wesleyan Coyotes		

Senior career*
Years	Team	Apps	(Gls)
2016	Santa Clarita Blue Heat		
2019–2024	Tijuana	81	(2)
2025	Querétaro	32	(2)

International career
- Mexico
- * Club domestic league appearances and goals as of 2 March 2020

Yadira Toraya Guerrero (born 8 November 1991) is an American-born Mexican former footballer who played as a central defense for Liga MX Femenil side club Tijuana.

== Early life ==
Toraya was born in California and attended Pacifica High School in Oxnard, California. She attended High School from 2006 to 2009 and played 4 years of varsity Soccer. Throughout her high school career, she played in a total of 68 games, scored 59 goals and had 28 assists. She graduated from Pacifica High School in 2009.

== Playing career ==
=== College ===
Toraya started her college career at Ventura College in 2009. During her time at Ventura, she was named First Team all-Conference and Western State Conference Champion in 2010.

In 2011, Toraya transferred to Kansas Wesleyan University. During her time at KWU, she earned several recognitions. She was named KCAC First Team All Region and All- American Selections in back-to-back years She was also named the KCAC Defensive Player of the year and was a KCAC Conference Champion and Tournament Champion.

=== Houston Dash ===
In 2015, Toraya played in the pre-Season for the Houston Dash in the Women's national Soccer League.

=== Santa Clarita Blue Heat ===
In 2016, Toraya joined the Santa Clarita Blue Heat, a semi-professional team in the United Women's Soccer League. She helped the Blue Heat win the Conference and National Championship. During her time with the Santa Clarita Blue Heat, she was named to the All UWS "Starting 11" First Team.

=== Club Tijuana ===
On 22 July 2019, Toraya debuted for Club Tijuana from Liga MX Femenil. Her first game was against Tiburones Rojos de Veracruz. She is currently on the Roster for the rest of the 2019 Season

== International career ==
In 2015, Toraya played her first match with the Mexico women's national football team, where she suited up and played against the United States on 17 May 2015 in an international friendly.

Toraya was named the first Alternate for the 2015 Mexican woman's world cup squad. She was invited to join the Mexican Woman's National Team for the Pan-American Games held in Toronto after the World Cup.

== Coaching career ==
Toraya was an assistant girls' soccer coach for Pacifica High School. She helped coach the team to multiple CIF playoff appearances.

Toraya was hired to the KWU Woman's Soccer Coaching Staff as an Assistant Coach for the 2017 Season.
