= Gene Bissell Field =

Kansas Wesleyan University field

Coordinates: 38.81351°N 97.60617°W

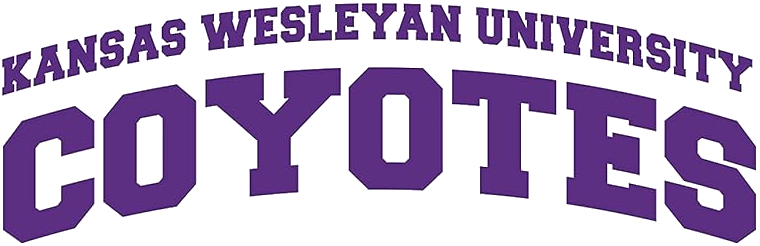
- Interactive map of Gene Bissell Field
- Full name: Gene Bissell Field at JRI Hospitality Stadium
- Address: Salina, KS; United States
- Location: Graves Family Sports Complex
- Owner: Kansas Wesleyan University
- Operator: KWU Athletics
- Type: Stadium
- Current use: Football; Soccer; Track and field

Construction
- Opened: October 2015; 11 years ago

Tenants
- Kansas Wesleyan Coyotes teams: football, soccer, track and field

Website
- kwucoyotes.com/jri-stadium

Gene Bissell Field at JRI Hospitality Stadium is a stadium located on the campus of Kansas Wesleyan University in Salina, Kansas. The facility is part of the Graves Family Sports Complex and serves as home field for the Kansas Wesleyan Coyotes football, soccer, and track and field teams.

== History ==
The Bissell Field replaced the former Glenn L. Martin Stadium, built in 1940 and demolished in 2014. The stadium had been home to the Coyotes football, soccer, and track teams until 2007, when the university ceased to use it due to its condition.

The stadium was dedicated to Franklin Gene Bissell on October 2, 2015, prior to the inaugural game at the Graves Family Sports Complex on the KWU campus signifying the long-lasting impact that Bissell had on students, athletes, faculty and the community.

The field is circled with a collegiate track and includes a grandstand which seats over 1,900 spectators.
