= Mabee Arena =

Indoor arena in Salina, Kansas

Coordinates: 38°48′50″N 97°36′29″W

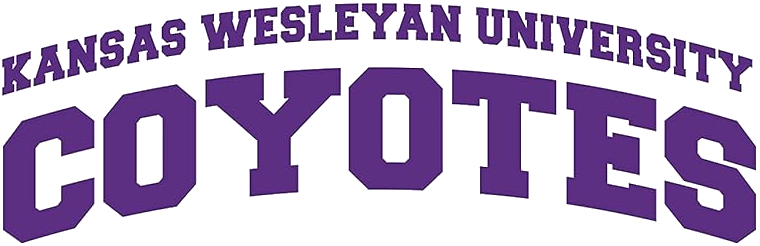
- Interactive map of Mabee Arena
- Address: Salina, KS; United States
- Location: Graves Family Sports Complex
- Owner: Kansas Wesleyan University
- Operator: KWU Athletics
- Type: Arena
- Current use: Basketball

Construction
- Opened: 2008; 18 years ago

Tenant
- Kansas Wesleyan Coyotes basketball

Website
- kwucoyotes.com/mabee-arena

Mabee Arena is a 1,500-seat arena located on the campus of Kansas Wesleyan University in Salina, Kansas. The facility is part of the Graves Family Sports Complex and serves as home field for the Kansas Wesleyan Coyotes basketball teams.
