= Ron Dupree =

American football coach (1941–2020)

Biographical details
- Born: February 13, 1941; Alexandria, Louisiana, U.S.
- Died: November 27, 2020 (aged 79)

Playing career

Football
- 1965–1966: Highland (KS)
- 1967: South Dakota
- 1968: Emporia State
- Position: Running back

Coaching career (HC unless noted)

Football
- 1971: Penney HS (MO)
- 1972: Mount Carmel HS (TX)
- 1973: Arp HS (TX)
- 1974: Highland (KS)
- 1975: Eastern Montana
- 1976: Arp HS (TX)
- 1978: Graham HS (TX)
- 1979–1980: Kansas Wesleyan
- 1981–1984: Little Cypress-Mauriceville HS (TX)
- 1985–1986: Gilmer HS (TX)
- 1987: Delta State (GA)
- 1988–1989: La Joya HS (TX)
- 1992: Roosevelt HS (TX)
- 1993: Macalester (OC)
- 1994–1995: Marfa HS (TX)
- 1996: Kansas Wesleyan
- 2001: Castleberry HS (TX)

Head coaching record
- Overall: 16–21 (college); 3–5 (junior college)

Accomplishments and honors

Championships
- 1 Frontier (1975)

Ron Paul Dupree (February 13, 1941 – November 27, 2020) was an American football player and coach. Dupree was the 15th head football coach at Kansas Wesleyan University in Salina, Kansas, serving for three seasons, from 1979 to 1980 and again in 1996. His coaching record at Kansas Wesleyan was 11–18.

Dupree graduated from high school in Orange, Texas and attended Highland Junior College in Highland, Kansas, where he played football as a running back in 1965 and 1966. He also played basketball at Highland. Dupree transferred to the University of South Dakota in 1967 and then to Kansas State Teachers College—now known as Emporia State University—in 1968. He married Carol Sue Scholz, on July 4, 1968, in Wathena, Kansas.

Dupree began his coaching career at the high school level, coaching football in Arkansas, Missouri, and Texas and compiling a record of 29–16 at four schools. He was hired as head football coach at Highland Junior College in 1974. The following year, he was hired in the same capacity at Eastern Montana College—now known as Montana State University Billings.

Dupree died on November 27, 2020.

== Head coaching record ==
=== College ===
Year	Team	Overall	Conference	Standing	Bowl/playoffs
Eastern Montana Yellowjackets (Frontier Conference) (1975)
1975	Eastern Montana	5–3	3–1	1st	
Eastern Montana:		5–3	3–1		
Kansas Wesleyan Coyotes (Kansas Collegiate Athletic Conference) (1979–1980)
1979	Kansas Wesleyan	2–7	2–6	T–7th	
1980	Kansas Wesleyan	6–4	6–2	T–2nd	
Kansas Wesleyan Coyotes (Kansas Collegiate Athletic Conference) (1996)
1996	Kansas Wesleyan	3–7	3–5	6th	
Kansas Wesleyan:		11–18	11–13		
Total:		16–21			
National championship Conference title Conference division title or championship game berth
