= Wes Pate =

American football player (born 1979)

Profile
- Position: Quarterback

Personal information
- Born: March 24, 1979 (age 47); Longview, Texas, U.S.
- Listed height: 6 ft 2 in (1.88 m)
- Listed weight: 228 lb (103 kg)

Career information
- High school: Arp (Arp, Texas)
- College: Louisiana Tech (1997–1998); Stephen F. Austin (1999–2001)
- NFL draft: 2002: 7th round, 236th overall pick

Career history
- Baltimore Ravens (2002)*; Chicago Rush (2003)*; Seattle Seahawks (2003); → Frankfurt Galaxy (2003); Chicago Rush (2004)*
- * Offseason or practice squad member only

Awards and highlights
- SFL Offensive Player of the Year (2001); 3× Second-team All-SFL (1999–2001)

John Wesley Pate (born March 24, 1979) is an American former football quarterback. He played college football for the Louisiana Tech Bulldogs and Stephen F. Austin Lumberjacks. He was selected by the Baltimore Ravens in the seventh round of the 2002 NFL draft.

== Early life ==
John Wesley Pate was born on March 24, 1979, in Longview, Texas. He played high school football at Arp High School in Arp, Texas, finishing with career totals of 5,150 yards and 48 touchdowns. He earned all-state honors as a senior.

== College career ==
Pate first played college football for the Louisiana Tech Bulldogs of Louisiana Tech University. He was redshirted in 1997. He played in ten games in 1998 as the co-backup (with Brian Stallworth) to starter Tim Rattay, completing 12 of 26 passes for 149 yards, two touchdowns, and one interception. Pate also spent some time on the kickoff return team.

In 1999, with Rattay returning for another year, Pate transferred to Stephen F. Austin State University to receive more playing time. Pate was a three-year starter for the Stephen F. Austin Lumberjacks from 1999 to 2001, garnering second-team All-Southland Football League (SFL) recognition each season. He completed 197 of 333 passes (59.2%) for 2,626 yards, 19 touchdowns, and eight interceptions his senior year, garnering SFL Offensive Player of the Year recognition. He threw for 6,058 yards and 49 touchdowns overall as a Lumberjack.

== Professional career ==
Pate was selected by the Baltimore Ravens in the seventh round, with the 236th overall pick, of the 2003 NFL draft. He officially signed with the team on July 24. He was released on August 30 before the start of the 2002 NFL season, and signed to the team's practice squad on September 3. Pate was later released by the Ravens.

On November 19, 2002, Pate signed with the Chicago Rush of the Arena Football League (AFL) for the 2003 AFL season. He signed with the Seattle Seahawks on January 10, 2003. He was allocated to NFL Europe to play for the Frankfurt Galaxy. However, he suffered an injury and never played in NFL Europe. Pate was later placed on the reserve/non-football injury list. He was released by the Seahawks on December 17, 2003. Pate was activated by the Chicago Rush on January 5, 2004, a month before the start of the 2004 AFL season. He was waived by Chicago on January 16, 2004.
