= C. L. Williams =

American football coach

Coaching career (HC unless noted)
- 1908–1909: Kansas Wesleyan

Head coaching record
- Overall: 9–5

C. L. Williams was an American football coach. He was the third head football coach at Kansas Wesleyan University in Salina, Kansas, serving for two seasons, from 1908 to 1909, compiling a record of 9–5.
