= Alexander Mackie =

Alexander Mackie may refer to:

- Alex Mackie (fl. 1900s), Scottish football manager (Sunderland)
- Alec Mackie (Irish footballer) (1903–1984), Northern Irish footballer (Arsenal, Portsmouth)
- Alec Mackie (Scottish footballer) (fl. 1900s), Scottish footballer (Rangers)
- Alexander Mackie, founder of Albyn School, Aberdeen, Scotland
- Alexander Mackie (Australian academic) (1876–1955), first Professor of Education at the University of Sydney
- Alexander Brown Mackie (1894–1966), American college professor, business college founder, and college sports coach
