= Ben Vidricksen =

American politician

Member of the Kansas State Senate from the 24th District
- In office 1979–2000
- Preceded by: John Simpson
- Succeeded by: Pete Brungardt

Personal details
- Born: June 11, 1927 near New Cambria, Kansas
- Died: September 14, 2015 (aged 88) Salina, Kansas
- Party: Republican
- Spouse: Lola Nienke
- Children: 5
- Education: Kansas Wesleyan University

Benjamin Eugene Vidricksen (June 11, 1927–September 14, 2015) was an American politician who served for over two decades as a Republican in the Kansas State Senate, from 1979 to 2000.

== Personal life ==
Vidricksen was born on his family's farm near New Cambria, Kansas. After graduating from high school in 1944, Vidricksen served in the U.S. Navy during World War II. Following his 16 months in the South Pacific, he returned to Kansas and enrolled in Kansas Wesleyan University, earning a bachelor's degree in pre-law in 1951. During this period, he met and married Lola Nienke; the marriage lasted until her death in 1992.

After a stint working in O'Neill, Nebraska as a dairy manager, he returned to Kansas in 1958 to go into business with his brother Robert and their mother Ruby, owning and operating several restaurants in Salina and a catering business (his brother was inducted into the Kansas Restaurant Hall of Fame in 1980). He died in Salina.

== Political career ==
In 1979, Vidricksen was appointed to fill the Kansas Senate seat of John Simpson, who had resigned to pursue a U.S. Senate run against Bob Dole. He won election in his own right during the 1980 elections, and spent the next two decades representing the 24th district, residing in Salina.

During his time in the State Senate, Vidricksen served as Assistant Majority Leader for 16 years. Kansas Governor Sam Brownback credited Vidricksen as a key player in enlarging Interstate 135; a portion of the highway was named after Vidricksen in 2002.
