= W. F. Ragle =

American football coach (1892–1939)

Biographical details
- Born: February 19, 1892; Baldwin City, Kansas, U.S.
- Died: June 4, 1939 (aged 47); Excelsior Springs, Missouri, U.S.

Coaching career (HC unless noted)
- 1915: Kansas Wesleyan

Head coaching record
- Overall: 5–4

William Floyd Ragle (February 19, 1892 – June 4, 1939) was an American football coach. He was the fifth head football coach at Kansas Wesleyan University in Salina, Kansas, serving for one season, in 1915, and compiling a record of 5–4.

== Head coaching record ==
Year	Team	Overall	Conference	Standing	Bowl/playoffs
Kansas Wesleyan Coyotes (Kansas Collegiate Athletic Conference) (1915)
1915	Kansas Wesleyan	5–4	5–3	5th	
Kansas Wesleyan:		5–4	5–3		
Total:		5–4			
