= Albert B. Cowden =

American football and basketball coach

Biographical details
- Born: November 15, 1879; Dallas County, Missouri, U.S.
- Died: November 23, 1958 (aged 79); Alamo Heights, Texas, U.S.

Coaching career (HC unless noted)

Football
- 1903–1905: Kansas Wesleyan

Basketball
- 1905–1906: Kansas Wesleyan
- 1912–1913: Kansas Wesleyan

Head coaching record
- Overall: 6–4 (football); 10–12 (basketball)

Albert Buckner Cowden (November 15, 1879 – November 23, 1958) was an American college football and college basketball coach. He was the first head football coach at Kansas Wesleyan University in Salina, Kansas, serving for the 1903 and 1905 seasons and compiling a record of 6–4; the school did not field a team in 1904.

== Head coaching record ==
=== Football ===
Year	Team	Overall	Conference	Standing	Bowl/playoffs
Kansas Wesleyan Coyotes (Independent) (1903–1905)
1903	Kansas Wesleyan	3–3			
1904	No team				
1905	Kansas Wesleyan	3–1			
Kansas Wesleyan:		6–4			
Total:		6–4			
