= Lycoming College =

Private college in Williamsport, Pennsylvania, U.S.

Coordinates: 41.2456°N 77.0001°W

- Former names: Williamsport Academy (1812–1848); Williamsport Dickinson Seminary (1848–1929); Williamsport Dickinson Seminary and Junior College (1929–1947)
- Motto: Ἀλήθεια (Truth)
- Type: Private liberal arts college
- Established: 1812; 214 years ago (predecessor); 1947; 79 years ago (senior college)
- Religious affiliation: United Methodist Church
- Academic affiliations: Annapolis Group
- Endowment: $198.15 million (2024)
- President: Charles W. Edmonds
- Faculty: 91
- Undergraduates: 1,200
- Location: Williamsport, Pennsylvania, U.S.
- Campus: 60 acres (24 ha); Suburban
- Colors: (Blue and gold)
- Nickname: Warriors
- Sporting affiliations: NCAA Division III; Landmark Conference
- Website: www.lycoming.edu
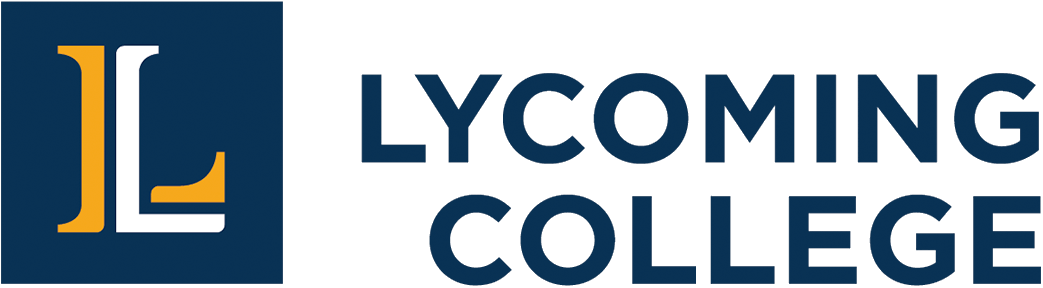

Lycoming College is a private liberal arts college in Williamsport, Pennsylvania. Founded in 1812, Lycoming College is affiliated with the United Methodist Church but operates as an independent institution. Through its history, it has been an academy, seminary, junior college, and four-year college.

== History ==
Lycoming College traces its roots to 1812 and the founding of the "Williamsport Academy" for the Education of Youth in English and other languages, in the useful arts, science and literature". Eight spirited citizens secured the charter for the school and founded the academy to improve the educational opportunities of the community. Attendance was by subscription, although a state grant ensured that a number of underprivileged children would be taught free of charge. The academy was for boys but accepted girls in the 1830s. It was one of the early academics in Pennsylvania which placed it on the frontier of academy-based education in the state.

By 1847, Williamsport had a public school system in place. Benjamin H. Crever, a Methodist preacher based in Milton, heard the academy was for sale. Upon his recommendation, the Baltimore Conference purchased the school, which opened in the fall of 1848 as the "Williamsport Dickinson Seminary", a preparatory school for Dickinson College, another Methodist school.

Rev. Crever is considered to be the founder of Lycoming College, as he was the one to transition the high school into its collegiate beginnings. After turning the Williamsport Academy into an institution of higher learning, Crever moved on to serve as a chaplain in the Civil War and founded a total of four schools. Only Lycoming College remains as his educational legacy.

In 1921, John W. Long became the ninth president of the school. A pastor at St. Paul's Methodist Church in State College and founder of the Wesley Foundation at Pennsylvania State College, now Penn State University, he had pastoral experience and working with students. He became president of three institutions without moving. He transformed Williamsport Dickinson Seminary into "Williamsport Dickinson Seminary and Junior College" in 1929. It was the first private junior college in the state and another frontier in higher education in America.

In 1947, the school became "Lycoming College", a four-year school. The college adopted the name "Lycoming" in 1948, a Native American word for a nearby stream which means "sandy stream" and the name of the county. These changes came with substantial support from the college's board of trustees and the local community. In 1949, the college conferred its first baccalaureate degrees.

James E. Douthat became the 14th president in 1989. Under his leadership, the college's enrollment grew by 27 percent and its endowment and other funds under management increased from $17 million to more than $185 million. Since his arrival, the campus had been involved in a strategic planning process to continually evaluate student needs and adapt the College's programs to those needs. Under his leadership, the college saw the establishment and implementation of a new faculty governance structure, a major capital campaign to build the endowment, improved facilities, and the adoption of a revised curriculum for the college that responds to changing skill set needs.

Kent C. Trachte became Lycoming's 15th president in 2013. He continued many of the important themes of his predecessor, including working closely with the board of trustees and the faculty. He launched a new long-range planning effort, many of its goals achieved. The college is now into another long-range planning era. He presided over the completion of the Lynn Science Center, generated interest in and led the construction of the Krapf Gateway Center as the new entrance of the campus, and the construction of a new music practice building opened in November 2022. He led the college in a new campus-community project to revitalize the Old Town section of Williamsport and a major effort to open its doors to students more representative of a diverse American society.

Charles "Chip" W. Edmonds took office as the college's 16th president in July 2025. Edmonds was previously the college's executive vice president from 2017 until 2025. Under his previous title, Edmonds acquired funds for the Krapf Gateway Building through financial campaigns as well as developing a campus facility planning strategy.

== Rankings ==
Lycoming was ranked 96th among "National Liberal Arts Colleges" in 2025 U.S. News & World Report, 5th in "Social Mobility", and 21st in "Best Value". It is listed as a "Best College" in The Princeton Review's Best 387 Colleges for 2021 and 61st by Washington Monthly in 2020.

== Academics ==
Lycoming College confers both Bachelor of Arts and Bachelor of Science degrees in more than 52 major fields of study and offers more than 67 minors.

=== Interdisciplinary program ===
With the Lycoming College interdisciplinary program, students have the opportunity to design their own programs of study. By combining courses from more than one department, students become active participants in creating their own majors with support from faculty advisor(s) and a panel of faculty members from each of the sponsoring departments.

=== Special academic programs ===
The Lycoming Scholars Program is a special program designed to meet the needs and aspirations of highly motivated students of superior intellectual ability. Lycoming Scholars participate in special, semester-long, interdisciplinary seminars on topics chosen by the faculty and students on the Scholars Council.

Pre-professional programs including pre-law, pre-med, pre-vet, and pre-ministry provide students with advisors who ensure students take the right courses to prepare for graduate school and success in these professions.

Lycoming's MBA 4-1 agreement with the Saunders College Business at Rochester Institute of Technology allows students to opt out of some graduate-level courses, saving on tuition costs and completing an MBA in one calendar year.

An engineering 3-2 partnership with the Watson School of Engineering at Binghamton University allows students to spend their first three years building foundational knowledge at Lycoming and a final two years completing an electrical or industrial engineering degree at Binghamton.

== Campus ==
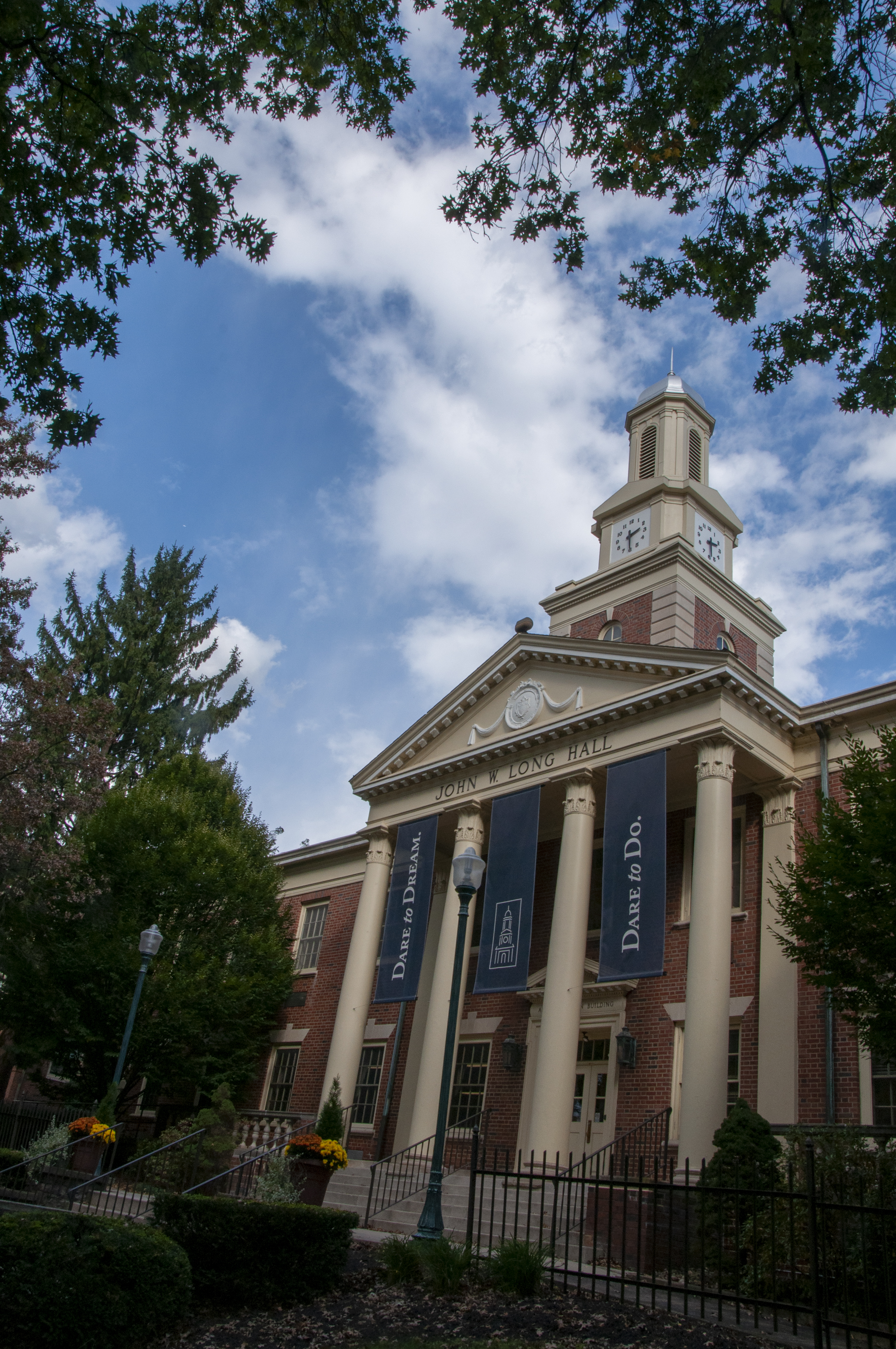
Long Hall

Lycoming College rests on a 42-acre campus in north central Pennsylvania. Most buildings have been constructed since 1950 in a pre-Georgian style, and many have been refurbished since. The most recently constructed buildings include the Lynn Science Center (2015), adjacently connected to the Heim Science Center and holding the Detwiler Planetarium, and the Krapf Gateway Center (2019) which houses the Office of Admissions, Office of Alumni and Advancement, the Center for Enhanced Academic Experiences, and the Outdoor Leadership and Education program. Lycoming's academic facilities include Wendle Hall, the Academic Center, Fine Arts Building, Communications Building, Heim Science Center, Clarke Chapel, Mary Lindsay Welch Honors Hall, and the Lynn Science Center.

Unique facilities include the Detwiler Planetarium, Mary L. Welch Theatre, Snowden Library, the Sylk Digital Arts Laboratory, an electronic music studio, a radio station, and a greenhouse.

Athletic facilities include Lamade Gymnasium, the Keiper Recreation Center, and an outdoor intramural field. The 12-acre Shangraw Athletic Complex lies a few blocks north of the main campus with football and softball fields as well as the UPMC Field for soccer and lacrosse.

The Lycoming College Art Gallery is located at 25 West Fourth Street in downtown Williamsport. Additionally, the Lycoming Biology Field Station Inc., a nonprofit corporation and wholly owned subsidiary of Lycoming College, sits on 116 acres of land just 15 minutes from campus, which is frequently used by the biology department and the Clean Water Institute.

== Athletics ==
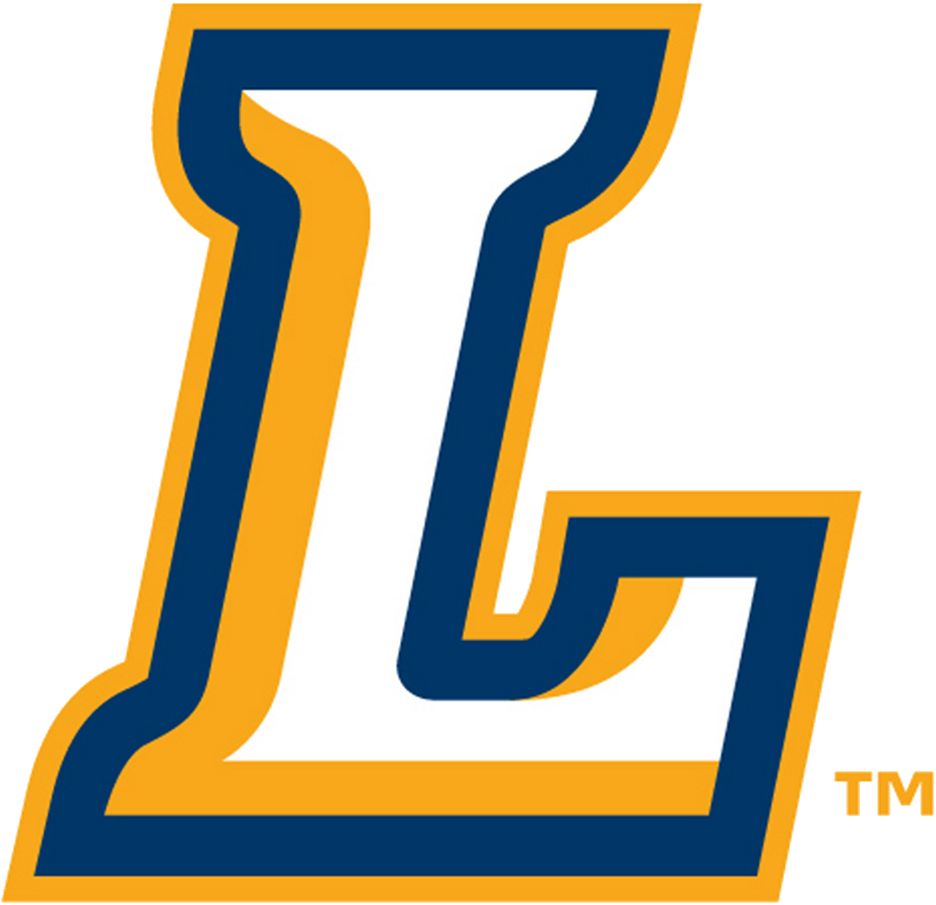
Lycoming athletics monogram

Today, Lycoming fields men's and women's teams in basketball, cross country, lacrosse, soccer, swimming, and tennis, men's teams in baseball, football, golf, and wrestling, and women's teams in field hockey, softball, and volleyball. Lycoming was a member in the Middle Atlantic Conferences, with the baseball, basketball, field hockey, lacrosse, soccer, tennis, golf, softball, and volleyball teams competing in the MAC Freedom, but the athletic department accepted an invitation to move 18 of its 19 sports to the Landmark Conference, starting in 2023-24.

The Warriors have won 43 Middle Atlantic Conference titles, with football and wrestling winning 15 each, men's basketball six, men's soccer three, women's swimming and volleyball two, and men's tennis and softball one.

Lycoming College celebrated its 125th year of varsity athletics in 2015, as a baseball team was first formed at Dickinson Seminary in 1890. In 1952, Lycoming, recently becoming an established four-year college, was invited to join the Middle Atlantic Conference.

The football team had a period where it was one of the most competitive in Division III football, as College Football Hall of Fame head coach Frank Girardi won 257 games from 1972 to 2007, which still ranks 16th all-time in NCAA history. He led the Warriors to the national title game in 1990 and 1997 and the semifinals in 1996.

== Residential living ==
Lycoming College requires students to live in campus housing, with exceptions for local students who commute from home. Housing options include eight residence halls (Skeath, Asbury, East, Wesley, Rich, Williams, Crever, and Forest), Douthat Commons student apartments, and several college‑owned apartment buildings adjacent to campus.

Dining facilities include Wertz Dining Hall, open seven days a week for breakfast, lunch, and dinner; Café 1812 and the Gateway Café, open for breakfast and lunch five days a week; and Jack’s Corner, which serves food in the evening. The college operates the Warrior Coffee Project, an interdisciplinary program that collaborates with growers in the El Naranjito region of the Dominican Republic.

Academic buildings with computer labs and printers are accessible to students twenty‑four hours a day.

Campus traditions include a Thanksgiving dinner served family‑style by faculty and staff, and a Late Night Breakfast offered by faculty and staff during finals week.

== Notable alumni ==
- David G. Argall '80 – Pennsylvania House of Representatives (1984–2009), Pennsylvania State Senate (2009 to present)
- Larry A. Barretta '87 – Arena Football League player
- Joseph McCrum Belford (1868) – United States House of Representatives (1897–1899) from New York
- P. Kevin Brobson '92 - Pennsylvania Supreme Court Justice
- Edgar T. Collins, 1890, U.S. Army major general
- Deirdre P. Connelly '83 – Pharmaceuticals executive, Forbes 2009 list of World's 100 Most Powerful Women
- David Albaugh De Armond (1865) – United States House of Representatives (1891–1909) from Missouri
- Thomas W. Dempsey '52 – Pennsylvania House of Representatives (1987–2000); recipient of 2001 Angela R. Kyte Outstanding Alumnus Award
- Gene L. Dodaro '73 – Comptroller General of the United States from 2008 to 2025
- Robert W. Edgar '65 – President and CEO of Common Cause, a nonpartisan government watchdog organization
- Rusty E. Fricke '87 – Arena Football League player
- Ismael Gaspar-Martins '66 - Ambassador Extraordinary and Plenipotentiary, The Republic of Angola
- Milton E. Graff – Major League Baseball player (1957–1958) for the Kansas City Athletics
- Carl Grivner '75 - CEO of Colt Technologies
- Ruth E. (Perry) Hodge '58 – Retired archivist, U.S. Army and Pennsylvania State Archives, and author, Guide to African American Resources at the Pennsylvania State Archives (Pennsylvania Historical and Museum Commission, 2000, ISBN 978-0-8927-1087-4)
- James Hall Huling (1861) – United States House of Representatives (1895 to 1897) from West Virginia
- John C. Jopson '76 – Film and music video director
- Alexander Brown Mackie (1915) – Co-founder of Brown Mackie College
- Tom A. Marino '85 – U.S. Representative for Pennsylvania's 10th congressional district
- Henry Clay McCormick (1861) – United States House of Representatives (1887–1891) from Pennsylvania
- Alexander McDonald (1849) – United States Senate (1868–1871) from Arkansas
- James Monroe Miller (1875) – United States House of Representatives (1899–1911) from Kansas
- Rafael Moreno Valle Rosas '91 – Governor of the Mexican state of Puebla
- Peter D. Onorati '75 – Veteran actor
- James H. Osmer (1858) – United States House of Representatives (1879–1881) from Pennsylvania
- Harry F. Perretta '78 – Head Women's Basketball Coach at Villanova University, Inducted to Lycoming Athletic Hall of Fame in 2007
- Charles Emory Patton (1878) – United States House of Representatives (1911–1915) from Pennsylvania
- Robert Fleming Rich (1903) – United States House of Representatives (1945–1951) from Pennsylvania
- Milton George Urner (1856) – United States House of Representatives (1879–1883) from Maryland
- Thomas I. Vanaskie '75 – United States circuit judge on the United States Court of Appeals for the Third Circuit
- Tom H. Woodruff Jr. '80 – Oscar-winning special effects supervisor
- Gene Yaw '70 – Pennsylvania State Senator representing the 23rd Senatorial District
- Dick (Robert) Yuengling '66 - fifth-generation owner of D.G. Yuengling & Son, turned his family's struggling brewery into one of America's largest beer makers, recipient of 2016 Dr. James E. Douthat Outstanding Achievement Award
