= Senator Strahan =

Senator Strahan may refer to:

- Ernest Strahan (1901–1971), Kansas State Senate
- Reuben S. Strahan (1835–1895), Oregon State Senate
- Robert H. Strahan (1843–1884), New York State Senate
