= Arp Independent School District =

School district in Texas

Location
- 101 Toney Dr. Arp, Texas ESC Region 7 USA
- Coordinates: 32°13′43″N 95°3′25″W

District information
- Type: Independent school district
- Grades: Pre-K through 12
- Established: 1905
- Superintendent: Shannon Arrington

Students and staff
- Athletic conference: UIL Class 2A Football Division II
- District mascot: Tigers
- Colors: Maroon, White

Other information
- TEA District Accountability Rating for 2011-12: Recognized
- Website: Arp ISD

Arp Independent School District is a public school district based in Arp, Texas (USA).

It includes Arp and the Smith County portion of Overton.

== Finances ==
As of the 2010-2011 school year, the appraised valuation of property in the district was $369,413,000. The maintenance tax rate was $0.104 and the bond tax rate was $0.023 per $100 of appraised valuation.

== Academic achievement ==
In 2011, the school district was rated "recognized" by the Texas Education Agency. Forty-nine percent of districts in Texas in 2011 received the same rating. A school district in Texas can receive one of four possible rankings from the Texas Education Agency: Exemplary (the highest possible ranking), Recognized, Academically Acceptable, and Academically Unacceptable (the lowest possible ranking).

Historical district TEA accountability ratings

- 2011: Recognized
- 2010: Academically Acceptable
- 2009: Academically Acceptable
- 2008: Academically Acceptable
- 2007: Academically Unacceptable
- 2006: Academically Acceptable
- 2005: Academically Acceptable
- 2004: Academically Acceptable

== Schools ==
In the 2011-2012 school year, the district had students in four schools.

Regular instructional

- Arp High School (Grades 9-12)
- Arp Junior High (Grades 6-8)
- Arp Elementary School (Headstart & Grades PK-5)

JJAEP instructional

- Smith County JJAEP (Grades 6-12)

== Special programs ==
=== Athletics ===
Arp High School participates in the boys sports of baseball, basketball, football, and wrestling. The school participates in the girls sports of basketball, softball, and volleyball. For the 2012 through 2014 school years, Arp High School will play football in UIL Class 2A Division II.

== Notable people ==
The late Everett Doerge, a Louisiana state representative from Webster Parish from 1992 to 1998, began his teaching career in Arp about 1960. So did his wife and legislative successor, Jean M. Doerge of Minden, Louisiana.

== See also ==
- List of school districts in Texas
- List of high schools in Texas
