= DeMarvion Overshown =

American football player (born 2000)

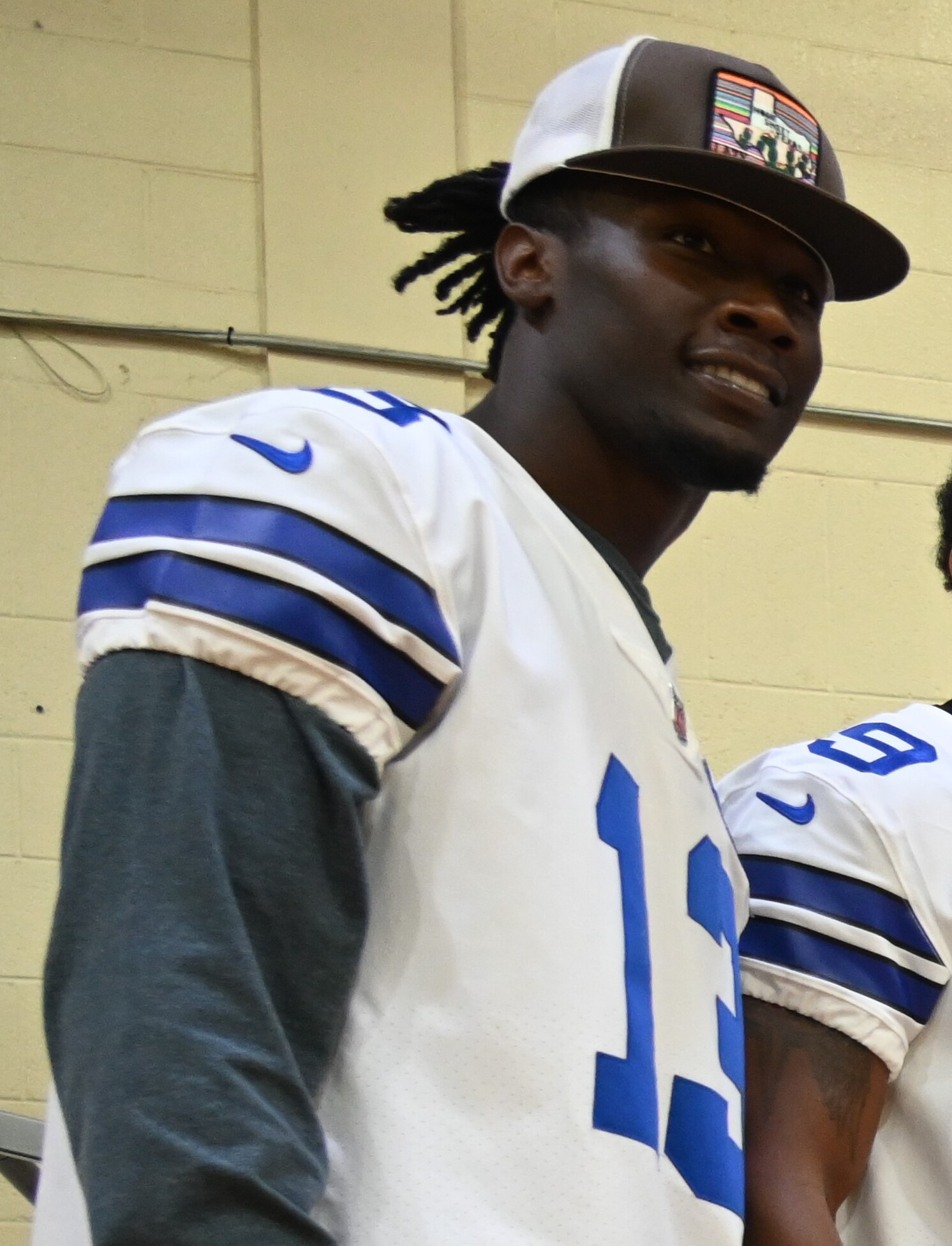
- Overshown with the Dallas Cowboys in 2024

No. 0 – Dallas Cowboys
- Position: Linebacker
- Roster status: Active

Personal information
- Born: August 13, 2000 (age 26); Tyler, Texas, U.S.
- Listed height: 6 ft 3 in (1.91 m)
- Listed weight: 235 lb (107 kg)

Career information
- High school: Arp (Arp, Texas)
- College: Texas (2018–2022)
- NFL draft: 2023: 3rd round, 90th overall pick

Career history
- Dallas Cowboys (2023–present)

Awards and highlights
- First-team All-Big 12 (2022)

Career NFL statistics as of Week 7, 2026
- Tackles: 131
- Sacks: 5
- Forced fumbles: 1
- Fumble recoveries: 1
- Pass deflections: 6
- Interceptions: 2
- Touchdowns: 1
- Stats at Pro Football Reference

DeMarvion Germanic Lee Overshown (born August 13, 2000) is an American professional football linebacker for the Dallas Cowboys of the National Football League (NFL). He played college football for the Texas Longhorns.

== Early life ==
Overshown attended and played football at Arp High School in Arp, Texas. As a freshman, he was promoted to the varsity team for the Class 3A district playoffs, where he played outside linebacker and defensive end.

As a sophomore, he played Defensive End, and received All-East Texas Newcomer of the Year honors.

As a junior he switched to safety, he was named All-East Texas Defensive Player of the Year and first-team All-district, while helping his team reach the state semifinals.

As a senior, he had 142 tackles (14 for loss), 5 sacks, 5 interceptions, 13 pass breakups, 4 forced fumbles and 2 fumble recoveries. He received Defensive MVP of District 9-3A II, first-team All-district, first-team All-State by the Associated Press, first-team All-State by the Texas Sports Writers Association and first-team All-USA Texas by USA Today honors.

Overshown was rated as a 5-star recruit and had 26 offers, including Texas, Alabama, Clemson, Georgia, LSU, Ohio State, and Oklahoma.

In December 2017, he committed to the University of Texas at Austin to play college football. In January 2018, he played in the Under Armour All-America Game.

== College career ==
Overshown accepted a football scholarship from the University of Texas at Austin. He played as a backup safety during his first two years, appearing in 17 games, while registering 19 tackles, 2 sacks and one interception.

As a sophomore in 2019, he missed four games due to a back injury, that he suffered in the seventh game against the University of Kansas.

Prior to his junior season in 2020, he switched to weakside linebacker. He started all 10 games, recording 60 tackles, one sack and two interceptions. He was named the Defensive MVP of the 2020 Alamo Bowl, after making 6 tackles (0.5 for loss), one interception, 2 quarterback hurries and one fumble recovery.

Overshown returned to Texas for his senior year, rather than enter the 2021 NFL draft. He started 10 games (missed one contest with a toe injury), while recording 74 tackles (led the team), 5.5 tackles for loss, 2 sacks, 2 fumble recoveries, 2 pass breakups and one blocked kick. He had 9 tackles (0.5 tackles for loss) against Texas Tech University. He made 10 tackles with a career-high eight solo stops and one fumble recovery against TCU.

As a super senior in 2022, he appeared in 12 games (11 starts), posting career-highs with 96 tackles (10 for loss), 4 sacks and five pass breakups. He received first-team All-Big 12 honors. He had 9 tackles (1.5 for loss) against Kansas State University. He made 11 tackles (half a tackle for loss) and half a sack against TCU. He had 14 tackles (2 for loss), one sack and 2 pass breakups against Baylor University.

== Professional career ==
Pre-draft measurables
Height	Weight	Arm length	Hand span	Wingspan	40-yard dash	10-yard split	20-yard split	20-yard shuttle	Three-cone drill	Vertical jump	Broad jump	Bench press
6 ft 2 5/8 in (1.90 m)	229 lb (104 kg)	32 1/4 in (0.82 m)	9 1/2 in (0.24 m)	6 ft 6 1/8 in (1.98 m)	4.56 s	1.59 s	2.62 s	4.47 s	7.17 s	36.5 in (0.93 m)	10 ft 6 in (3.20 m)	15 reps
All values from NFL Combine/Pro Day

Overshown was selected by the Dallas Cowboys in the third round (90th overall) of the 2023 NFL draft. During the second preseason game against the Seattle Seahawks, Overshown was carted off the field after sustaining an injury. It was revealed after the game he had a torn ACL, ending his season.

Overshown made his NFL debut in Week 1 of the 2024 season against the Browns and recorded a sack. He scored his first NFL touchdown in a Week 13 game on an interception return against the New York Giants on Thanksgiving Day. In 13 games (12 starts) for the Cowboys, he logged one interception, one forced fumble, one fumble recovery, five sacks, and 90 combined tackles. On December 10, 2024, it was announced that Overshown would miss the remainder of the season and part of the 2025 season after suffering a torn ACL, MCL, and PCL in Week 14 against the Cincinnati Bengals.

Overshown missed the first 10 weeks of the 2025 season in rehabilitation from his injury from the previous season. He was activated on November 14, 2025, ahead of Dallas' Week 11 matchup against the Las Vegas Raiders.

== Career statistics ==
=== NFL ===
Year	Team	Games		Tackles				Interceptions						Fumbles	
Year	Team	GP	GS	Cmb	Solo	Ast	Sck	PD	Int	Yds	Avg	Lng	TD	FF	FR
2024	DAL	13	12	90	56	34	5.0	4	1	23	23.0	23	0	1	1
2025	DAL	6	5	28	15	13	0.0	0	0	0	0.0	0	0	0	0
2026	DAL	1	1	7	1	6	0.0	0	0	0	0.0	0	0	0	0
Career		20	18	125	72	53	5.0	4	1	23	23.0	23	0	1	1

=== College ===
Year	Team	GP	Tackles					Interceptions					Fumbles			
Year	Team	GP	Solo	Ast	Cmb	TfL	Sck	Int	Yds	Avg	TD	PD	FR	Yds	TD	FF
2018	Texas	1	0	1	1	0	0	0	0	0	0	0	0	0	0	0
2019	Texas	5	17	1	18	7	2	1	0	0	0	3	0	0	0	1
2020	Texas	10	32	28	60	8	1	2	29	14.5	0	7	1	0	0	2
2021	Texas	11	38	36	74	5.5	2	0	0	0	0	2	2	0	0	0
2022	Texas	12	49	47	96	10	4	0	0	0	0	5	0	0	0	0
Career		39	136	113	249	30.5	9	3	29	9.7	0	17	3	0	0	3
