= 1980 United States Senate election in Kansas =

- November 4, 1980
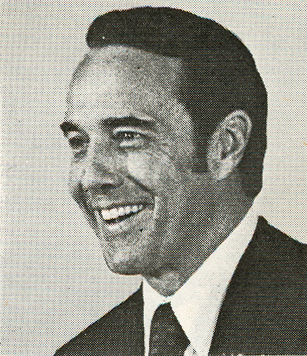

Nominee	Bob Dole	John Simpson
Party	Republican	Democratic
Popular vote	598,686	340,271
Percentage	63.76%	36.24%
- County results Dole: 50–60% 60–70% 70–80%
U.S. senator before election
Bob Dole
Republican
Elected U.S. Senator
Bob Dole
Republican

The 1980 United States Senate election in Kansas took place on November 4, 1980. Incumbent Republican U.S. Senator Bob Dole was re-elected to his third term in office, after briefly campaigning for President earlier that year. He defeated Democrat John Simpson, who had previously served in the Kansas State Senate as a Republican.

== Republican primary ==
=== Candidates ===
- Bob Dole, incumbent Senator and nominee for Vice President in 1976
- Jim H. Grainge, resident of Lenexa

=== Results ===
Republican primary results
Party	Candidate	Votes	%
Republican	Bob Dole (incumbent)	201,484	81.85%
Republican	Roger Marsh	44,674	18.15%
Total votes		246,158	100.00%

== Democratic primary ==
=== Candidates ===
- John A. Barnes, candidate for U.S. Representative in 1976 from Cherryvale
- Howard C. Lee, resident of Ottawa
- James R. Maher, Conservative Party nominee for Senate in 1978 from Overland Park
- Ken North, resident of Shawnee Mission
- Ed Phillips, candidate for U.S. Representative in 1978 from Louisburg
- John Simpson, former Republican State Senator from Salina

=== Results ===
Democratic primary results
Party	Candidate	Votes	%
Democratic	John Simpson	52,004	35.79%
Democratic	James R. Maher	46,322	31.88%
Democratic	John A. Barnes	16,466	11.33%
Democratic	Ken North	14,218	9.79%
Democratic	Ed Phillips	8,838	6.08%
Democratic	Howard C. Lee	7,461	5.14%
Total votes		145,309	100.00%

== General election ==
=== Results ===
General election results
Party	Candidate	Votes	%	±%
Republican	Bob Dole (incumbent)	598,686	63.76%	▲12.91
Democratic	John Simpson	340,271	36.24%	▼12.91
Total votes		938,957	100.00%	
Republican hold		Swing		

== See also ==
- List of United States senators from Kansas
- 1980 United States Senate elections
