= Ross Medical Education Center =

- Motto: Change your tomorrow, today.
- Type: Private for-profit college
- Established: 1969
- Location: St. Clair, Michigan, United States
- Website: rosseducation.edu

Ross Medical Education Center is a private for-profit college with its headquarters in St. Clair, Michigan, and multiple additional locations in the United States, most of them in Michigan, Ohio and Indiana. Ross was an investment of JLL Partners from 2011 until its conversion to 501(c)(3) nonprofit status in 2021; it is still classified as a for-profit institution by the U.S. Department of Education.

== History ==
In 2011, the Ross Medical Education Center in Sylvania, Ohio, changed its name to Ross College. Ross College Online was created to offer associate degree programs. In 2011, Ross also became an investment of JLL Partners.

In March 2012, Ross launched its Pharmacy Technician program in seven campuses.

On June 1, 2012, the name was officially changed to Ross Medical Education Center.

Today, Ross provides Medical Insurance Billing and Office Administration and Medical Assistant training in over 30 communities throughout Indiana, Kentucky, Michigan, Ohio, Tennessee, Alabama, Iowa, and West Virginia. At several of the campus locations, the Dental Assistant, Pharmacy Technician, and Veterinary Assistant programs are also offered.

In February 2021, Ross converted from a for-profit college to a Michigan nonstock nonprofit corporation and was classified by the IRS as a 501(c)(3) public charity. The United States Department of Education has not yet made a determination as to Ross' status as a nonprofit institution for the purpose of its participation in the Title IV federal student aid programs.

=== Acquisitions ===
In May 2008, Ross Education, LLC purchased Institute of Medical-Dental Technology. This location was renamed to Ross Institute of Medical and Dental Technology. On June 1, 2012, the name was officially changed to Ross Medical Education Center.

Later, in April 2014, Ross Education, LLC purchased Health Training Center.

In March 2015, Ross Education, LLC branched out from their healthcare training focus and purchased Michigan-based Tri-Area Trucking School. Currently, Tri-Area Trucking School has one campus located in Midland, Michigan and offers training for both Class A and B Commercial Drivers Licenses.

In January 2017, Ross purchased the remaining three campuses of Brown Mackie College.

== Accreditation ==
All Ross Medical Education Center campuses and Ross College are institutionally accredited by Accrediting Bureau of Health Education Schools.

== Locations ==
- Kalamazoo, Michigan
- Ann Arbor, Michigan
- Bettendorf, Iowa
- Bowling Green, Kentucky
- Brighton, Michigan
- Canton, Michigan
- Charleston, West Virginia
- Cincinnati, Ohio
- Davison, Michigan
- Dayton, Ohio
- Elyria, Ohio
- Erlanger, Kentucky
- Evansville, Indiana
- Flint, Michigan
- Fort Wayne, Indiana
- Grand Rapids, Michigan
- Granger, Indiana
- Hopkinsville, Kentucky
- Huntsville, Alabama
- Johnson City, Tennessee
- Kentwood, Michigan
- Knoxville, Tennessee
- Kokomo, Indiana
- Lafayette, Indiana
- Lansing, Michigan
- Madison Heights, Michigan
- Midland, Michigan
- Morgantown, West Virginia
- Muncie, Indiana
- New Baltimore, Michigan
- Niles, Ohio
- North Canton, Ohio
- Ontario, Ohio
- Owensboro, Kentucky
- Port Huron, Michigan
- Portage, Michigan
- Roosevelt Park, Michigan
- Saginaw, Michigan
- Taylor, Michigan

== Online education ==
In 2011, Ross College began offering an online Medical Assistant Associate of Applied Science degree completion program for Ross graduates. By August 2012, Ross College launched three other online associate degree Programs. There are now five associate degree programs offered by Ross College Online.
