= Graves Family Sports Complex =

Sports complex in Salina, Kansas

Coordinates: 38.81348°N 97.60617°W

The Graves Family Sports Complex is a part of the Kansas Wesleyan University campus, and is home to the Kansas Wesleyan Coyotes. The complex features a grandstand, track, tennis courts, practice field, and Gene Bissell Field. It is named in honor of the Graves family; former Kansas Governor Bill Graves (a KWU alum) helped lead the fundraising effort.

The new complex was officially opened on October 3, 2015, with a football game against KCAC rival McPherson Bulldogs, winning 43–7.
