= Brown Mackie College =

Defunct system of for-profit colleges

- Brown Mackie College logo
- Type: Private for-profit college system
- Active: 1892–2017 (124–125 years)
- President: Danny Finuf (1995–2016)
- Students: 7,773 (2016)
- Location: Cincinnati, Ohio, United States
- Website: brownmackie.edu

Brown Mackie College was a private for-profit college system in the United States. The colleges offered bachelor's degrees, associate degrees, and certificates in programs including early childhood education, information technology, health sciences, and legal studies. Brown Mackie's schools were most recently owned by Education Management Corporation (EDMC).

In 2016, 22 of 27 Brown Mackie campuses closed as Brown Mackie's parent company faced major legal and financial problems related to consumer fraud. The Akron campus was closed in September 2016 and the remaining campuses were sold to the Dream Center Foundation in 2017.

Several Brown Mackie colleges were nationally accredited by the Accrediting Council for Independent Colleges and Schools, which subsequently lost its accreditation power.

== History ==
Brown Mackie College was founded in 1892 in Salina, Kansas as the Kansas Wesleyan School of Business. In 1938, two of its former instructors, Perry E. Brown and A. B. Mackie, incorporated the school as The Brown Mackie School of Business. The school was licensed by the Kansas Board of Regents to grant associate degrees in 1986.

Between the 1930s and 1990s the school in Salina, and other schools that would later carry the Brown Mackie name, were managed by several different organizations before being purchased by American Education Centers (AEC) in 1993. In 2003, Education Management Corporation (EDMC) acquired eighteen schools from AEC, including the original Brown Mackie College, and rebranded them all under the Brown Mackie name the following year. Throughout the mid-to-late 2000s, the university system was expanded with the construction of new Brown Mackie colleges. EDMC reported that it owned 28 Brown Mackie College campuses and enrolled 17,000 students in May 2013.

In June 2016, EDMC announced plans to close all but four Brown Mackie campuses due to severe drops in enrollment following lawsuits that cost the college system millions, damaged its reputation, and puts its accreditation in jeopardy. Enrolled students were allowed to finish their degrees prior to closing.

=== Legal issues ===
In 2007, two whistleblowers filed a lawsuit claiming that Brown Mackie recruiters received perks based on the number of students they were able to enroll, regardless of whether the student's success or completion of the program. Though the company denied these allegations, EDMC and the Obama administration reached a $95.5 million settlement with the Justice Department in 2015.

In 2011, another lawsuit was filed once again alleging Brown Mackie illegally incentivized meeting recruitment goals. This case reached a settlement in 2015 wherein EDMC agreed to reform recruiting practices, including disclosure of the transferability of Brown Mackie credits, more accurate representations of expected graduate outcomes, and more detailed information about taking out federal loans to help pay for a Brown Mackie education. Brown Mackie was also required to forgive $102.8 million in loans for students who enrolled briefly between 2006 and 2014 and were given misleading information about taking out federal loans. More than 80,000 students were impacted by this settlement. Each qualifying former student and each of the credit reporting agencies were to be notified of the settlement, and the settlement will be paid through 2022.

In 2016, eleven former Brown Mackie nursing students in Tucson, Arizona, sued the school for consumer fraud. The plaintiffs alleged that the poor training they received left them unable to be gainfully employed. The plaintiffs expected to graduate in 2015 until a state nursing board investigation found some of the school's faculty were unqualified and were using veterinary supplies to teach students how to care for human patients. The Arizona State Board of Nursing barred the Brown Mackie students from taking the practical nurses licensing exam and ordered the school to retrain the students at the company's expense. Brown Mackie was barred from enrolling new nursing students for two years following the incident, though the college system was shut down before the program could resume.

In 2022, Brown Mackie was one of 153 institutions included in student loan cancellation due to alleged fraud. The class action was brought by a group of more than 200,000 student borrowers, assisted by the Project on Predatory Student Lending, part of the Legal Services Center of Harvard Law School. A settlement was approved in August 2022, stating that the schools on the list were included "substantial misconduct by the listed schools, whether credibly alleged or in some instances proven." In April 2023, the Supreme Court rejected a challenge to the settlement and allowed to proceed the debt cancellation due to alleged fraud.

== Academics ==
Brown Mackie colleges offered degrees at the bachelor's and associate level as well as academic certificates. Areas of study at the schools included nursing, early childhood education, business and technology, healthcare and wellness, legal studies and construction trades.

Beginning in the spring of 2012, Brown Mackie began replacing traditional textbooks with digital textbooks as part of their new Student Advantage Program, which outfits incoming students with iPads in an effort to save students about $200 each term. Within a year, 13,000 students had opted in.

In 2014, Brown Mackie teamed up with the Smart Horizons and Cengage to help nontraditional, low-income students, such as high school dropouts, finish their high school degree. The program was offered on eight Brown Mackie campuses, including Cincinnati, Indianapolis, Kansas City, Miami, Phoenix, St. Louis, North Canton, and Louisville.

Some campuses offered options for distance education.

== Campuses ==
- Akron, Ohio – founded in 1980 as Southern Ohio College
- Albuquerque, New Mexico – founded in 2010
- Atlanta, Georgia – founded in 2003 as Asher School of Business
- Birmingham, Alabama – founded in 2010
- Boise, Idaho – founded in 2008
- Cincinnati, Ohio – founded in 1927 as The American Education Center (AEC) Southern Ohio College – Cincinnati, OH
- Dallas/Fort Worth, Texas – founded in 2012
- Findlay, Ohio – founded in 1926
- Fort Wayne, Indiana – founded in 1882 as Fort Wayne Commercial College, later known as Michiana College. Acquired by Brown Mackie in 2004.
- Greenville, South Carolina – founded in 2009
- Hopkinsville, Kentucky – founded in 1995 as RETS Medical & Business Institute. Acquired by Brown Mackie in 2003/2004. (sold to Ross College)
- Indianapolis, Indiana – founded in 2008
- Kansas City, Kansas – founded in 1892; this location was a branch of the Salina campus
- Louisville, Kentucky – founded in 1972 as the RETS Institute of Technology. Acquired by Brown Mackie in 2004.
- Merrillville, Indiana – founded in 1890 as LaPorte Business College, later renamed Commonwealth Business College. Subsequently known as the Reese School of Business and the Commonwealth Business College before taking on the Brown Mackie name in 1984.
- Miami, Florida – founded in 2005
- Michigan City, Indiana – founded in 1890 as LaPorte Business College, later renamed Commonwealth Business College. Subsequently known as the Reese School of Business and the Commonwealth Business College before taking on the Brown Mackie name in 1984.
- North Canton, Ohio – founded in 1984 as the National Electronics Institute. Purchased by Southern Ohio College in 2002 prior to becoming a Brown Mackie location in 2004. (sold to Ross College)
- Northern Kentucky – opened in 1981 as a Southern Ohio College branch
- Oklahoma City, Oklahoma – founded in 2011
- Phoenix, Arizona – founded in 2009
- Quad Cities, Iowa – founded in 1985 as Commonwealth Business College (sold to Ross College)
- Salina, Kansas – the first Brown Mackie location. founded in 1892 as Kansas Wesleyan College and later known as the Kansas Wesleyan School of Business. Changed ownership in 1938 and became the Brown Mackie School of Business; renamed Brown Mackie in 2003.
- San Antonio, Texas – founded in 2010
- South Bend, Indiana – established in 1882 as South Bend Commercial College, later known as South Bend College of Commerce, South Bend Business College, and Michiana College of Commerce before becoming a Brown Mackie location in 2004
- St. Louis, Missouri – founded in 2009
- Tucson, Arizona – founded in 1972 as Chaparral College. Acquired by EDMC and renamed Brown Mackie in 2007.
- Tulsa, Oklahoma – founded 1927 as part of the South Ohio College. Acquired by EDMC in 2003 and renamed Brown Mackie in 2004. Was a branch of the Art Institute of Phoenix.

== Athletics ==
The official name for the Brown Mackie College – Salina teams was the Lions. The Lions participated in three sports, baseball, basketball, and softball. They were part of the National Junior College Athletic Association and were an affiliate member of the Kansas Jayhawk Community College Conference.

The Kansas City campus briefly fielded athletic programs under the nickname "Cougars."
