= Gene Bissell =

American football player and coach (1926–2016)

Biographical details
- Born: April 12, 1926; Akron, Ohio, U.S.
- Died: January 28, 2016 (aged 89); Salina, Kansas, U.S.
- Education: Heidelberg College

Playing career
- 1948: Heidelberg

Coaching career (HC unless noted)
- 1950–1951: Kansas Wesleyan (assistant)
- 1952–1961: Kansas Wesleyan
- 1963–1978: Kansas Wesleyan

Head coaching record
- Overall: 115–119–7

Accomplishments and honors

Championships
- 4 KCAC (1956–1957, 1969, 1971)

Awards
- NAIA Hall of Fame (1991); Kansas Sports Hall of Fame (2019)

Franklin Gene Bissell (April 12, 1926 – January 28, 2016) was an American football player and coach. He served as the head football coach at Kansas Wesleyan University from 1952 to 1961 and again from 1963 to 1978, compiling a record of 115–119–7.

== Playing career ==
Bissell entered Heidelberg College and graduated after three years. While at Heidelberg, he played defensive tackle and also was a punter under the head coach Paul Hoernemann. Bissell started for three years and was co-captain of the undefeated 1948 Ohio Athletic Conference championship team.

Bissell also lettered in basketball two years and pitched for the baseball squad.

== Coaching career ==
Bissell started his coaching career at Kansas Wesleyan University as an assistant football coach in 1950. In 1952, he was named the 13th head football coach at Kansas Wesleyan. He also coached track and was an assistant basketball coach, in addition to teaching a full academic schedule. His record as the head football coach at Kansas Wesleyan was 115–119–7. His Coyotes won four Kansas Collegiate Athletic Conference (KCAC) championships.

== Death ==
He died on January 28, 2016, at the age of 89.

== Head coaching record ==
Year	Team	Overall	Conference	Standing	Bowl/playoffs
Kansas Wesleyan Coyotes (Kansas Collegiate Athletic Conference) (1952–1961)
1952	Kansas Wesleyan	5–4	2–4	6th	
1953	Kansas Wesleyan	3–5–1	3–3–1	4th	
1954	Kansas Wesleyan	5–3–1	4–2–1	T–3rd	
1955	Kansas Wesleyan	6–3	5–2	T–2nd	
1956	Kansas Wesleyan	8–1	7–0	1st	
1957	Kansas Wesleyan	8–1	6–1	1st	
1958	Kansas Wesleyan	4–4–1	3–4	T–4th	
1959	Kansas Wesleyan	3–5–1	3–3–1	4th	
1960	Kansas Wesleyan	4–4–1	4–4–1	T–5th	
1961	Kansas Wesleyan	4–5	4–5	T–5th	
Kansas Wesleyan Coyotes (Kansas Collegiate Athletic Conference) (1963–1978)
1963	Kansas Wesleyan	3–6	3–6	T–7th	
1964	Kansas Wesleyan	3–6	3–6	T–6th	
1965	Kansas Wesleyan	3–6	3–6	T–7th	
1966	Kansas Wesleyan	2–7	2–7	T–8th	
1967	Kansas Wesleyan	6–3	6–3	T–3rd	
1968	Kansas Wesleyan	7–2	7–2	2nd	
1969	Kansas Wesleyan	8–2	5–0	1st (North)	W KCAC Championship Game
1970	Kansas Wesleyan	7–2	3–2	3rd (North)	
1971	Kansas Wesleyan	8–1	8–0	1st	
1972	Kansas Wesleyan	3–5–1	3–4–1	6th	
1973	Kansas Wesleyan	2–8	1–7	9th	
1974	Kansas Wesleyan	2–8	2–6	T–7th	
1975	Kansas Wesleyan	5–5	5–3	T–2nd	
1976	Kansas Wesleyan	3–7	2–6	8th	
1977	Kansas Wesleyan	2–7–1	2–5–1	7th	
1978	Kansas Wesleyan	1–9	1–7	8th	
Kansas Wesleyan:		115–119–7	97–98–6		
Total:		115–119–7			
National championship Conference title Conference division title or championship game berth
