= John Simpson (Kansas politician) =

American politician

Member of the Kansas State Senate from the 17th District
- In office 1972–1972
- Preceded by: Ernest Strahan
- Succeeded by: John Crofoot

Member of the Kansas State Senate from the 24th District
- In office 1973–1979
- Succeeded by: Ben Vidricksen

Personal details
- Born: July 30, 1934 (age 91)
- Party: Republican; switched to Democrat in the 1980 election

John M. Simpson (born July 30, 1934) is a former politician and attorney from the U.S. state of Kansas. He served as a Republican in the Kansas State Senate from 1972 to 1979, before switching parties and unsuccessfully running as a Democrat in the 1980 election for U.S. Senate, challenging Republican incumbent Bob Dole.

== Political career ==
Simpson, a resident of Salina, Kansas, was initially appointed to the State Senate representing the 17th district in 1972, after a vacancy occurred following the death of the incumbent Ernest Strahan. In the November 1972 elections, he won election in his own right in the 24th district (after redistricting), and he served in the State Senate for the rest of the decade.

In the 1980 United States Senate election in Kansas, Simpson switched parties and ran as a Democrat against Bob Dole, announcing his campaign in the summer of 1979. He said that changed parties because he "felt the Democratic party offers the best solutions and best platforms for the problems this country faces", and denied changing parties in order to run for the Senate. Simpson narrowly won the Democratic Senate primary, taking only 36% of the vote, with 32% for the second-place finisher James Maher. He was beaten soundly in the general election, losing to Dole by a 64-36 margin.
