= Alexander Brown Mackie =

Biographical details
- Born: May 1, 1894; Gazaam, Pennsylvania, US
- Died: June 5, 1966 (aged 72); Salina, Kansas, US

Playing career

Football
- 1913: Dickinson Seminary

Coaching career (HC unless noted)

Football
- 1921–1937: Kansas Wesleyan

Basketball
- 1921–1938: Kansas Wesleyan

Administrative career (AD unless noted)
- 1921–1938: Kansas Wesleyan

Head coaching record
- Overall: 79–52–13 (football); 113–161 (basketball)

Accomplishments and honors

Championships
- Football; 6 KCAC (1927, 1929, 1931, 1934–1936)

Alexander Brown Mackie (May 1, 1894 – June 5, 1966) was an American football and basketball coach, college athletics administrator, professor, and college founder and president. He served as the head football coach at Kansas Wesleyan University in Salina, Kansas from 1921 to 1937, compiling a record of 79–52–13. He was also the head basketball coach at Kansas Wesleyan from 1921 to 1938, tallying a mark of 113–161. Mackie was the co-founder of Brown Mackie College, also in Salina, for which he served as president from 1938 until his retirement in 1963.

== Early life and education ==
Mackie was born on May 1, 1894, in Gazaam in Clearfield County, Pennsylvania. He graduated from Dickinson Seminary in Williamsport, Pennsylvania and Ohio Wesleyan University in Delaware, Ohio. Mackie played football for Dickinson Seminary in 1913.

Mackie served in the United States Navy as an ensign during World War I.

== Coaching career ==
Mackie coached athletics at Athens High School in The Plains, Ohio for two years before he was hired to head the athletic department at Kansas Wesleyan University of Salina, Kansas in 1921. He was the ninth head football coach for Kansas Wesleyan University in Salina, Kansas, serving for 17 seasons, from 1921 to 1937, compiling a record of 79–52–13.

Mackie's 1922 team was considered having "no great strengths" by football legend Walter Camp. As he spent more time with the program, his teams encountered more success. Mackie's teams won the Kansas Collegiate Athletic Conference championship five times during his tenure. In 1931, his team was one of the few undefeated teams in the country.

== Academic contributions ==
Mackie was the co-founder of Brown Mackie College in Salina, Kansas. He and Perry E. Brown founded the school as a business college, taking what was a part of Kansas Wesleyan's school of business.

== Head coaching record ==
Year	Team	Overall	Conference	Standing	Bowl/playoffs
Kansas Wesleyan Coyotes (Kansas Collegiate Athletic Conference) (1921–1937)
1921	Kansas Wesleyan	0–8	0–7	15th	
1922	Kansas Wesleyan	2–7	2–7	13th	
1923	Kansas Wesleyan	4–5–1	2–5–1	12th	
1924	Kansas Wesleyan	5–3	5–3	5th	
1925	Kansas Wesleyan	4–2–1	3–2–1	T–6th	
1926	Kansas Wesleyan	4–4	3–4	9th	
1927	Kansas Wesleyan	7–0–1	6–0–1	T–1st	
1928	Kansas Wesleyan	6–2–1	5–1–1	T–2nd	
1929	Kansas Wesleyan	6–0–2	4–0–1	1st	
1930	Kansas Wesleyan	4–3–2	2–2–1	T–3rd	
1931	Kansas Wesleyan	6–0–2	2–0–2	1st	
1932	Kansas Wesleyan	5–3	3–1	2nd	
1933	Kansas Wesleyan	5–4	2–2	3rd	
1934	Kansas Wesleyan	5–4	4–1	T–1st	
1935	Kansas Wesleyan	4–3–1	4–0–1	1st	
1936	Kansas Wesleyan	7–1–1	4–0–1	1st	
1937	Kansas Wesleyan	5–3–1	3–2	T–2nd	
Kansas Wesleyan:		79–52–13	54–37–10		
Total:		79–52–13			
National championship Conference title Conference division title or championship game berth
