= Arp, Texas =

- City
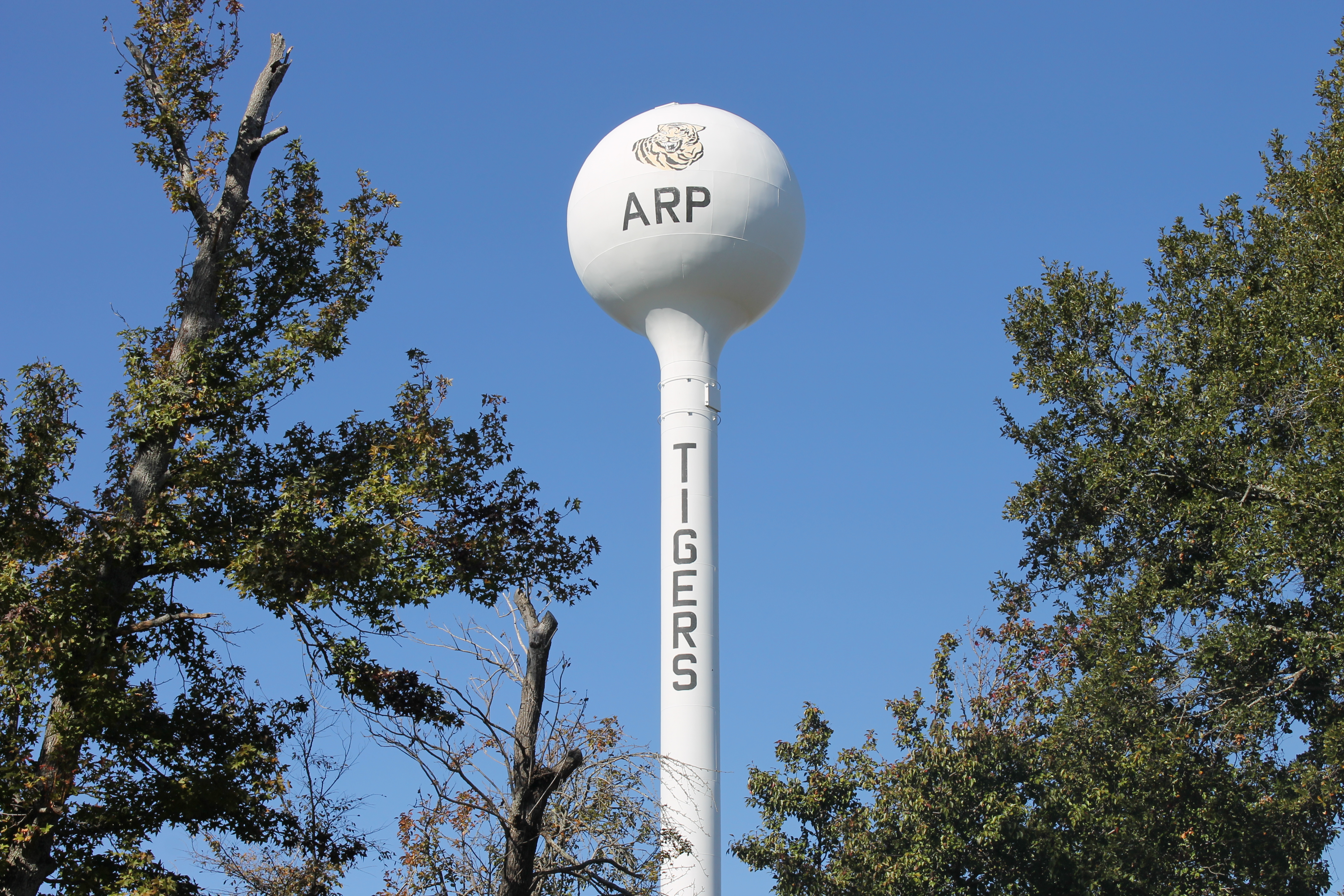
- Water tower in Arp, Texas
- Interactive map of Arp, Texas
- Coordinates: 32°13′40″N 95°03′13″W
- Country: United States
- State: Texas
- County: Smith

Area
  - Total: 2.64 sq mi (6.83 km^{2})
  - Land: 2.62 sq mi (6.78 km^{2})
  - Water: 0.019 sq mi (0.05 km^{2})
- Elevation: 489 ft (149 m)

Population (2020)
  - Total: 892
  - Density: 393.6/sq mi (151.97/km^{2})
- Time zone: UTC-6 (Central (CST))
  - Summer (DST): UTC-5 (CDT)
- ZIP code: 75750
- Area codes: 430, 903
- FIPS code: 48-04156
- GNIS feature ID: 2409733
- Website: www.cityofarptx.net

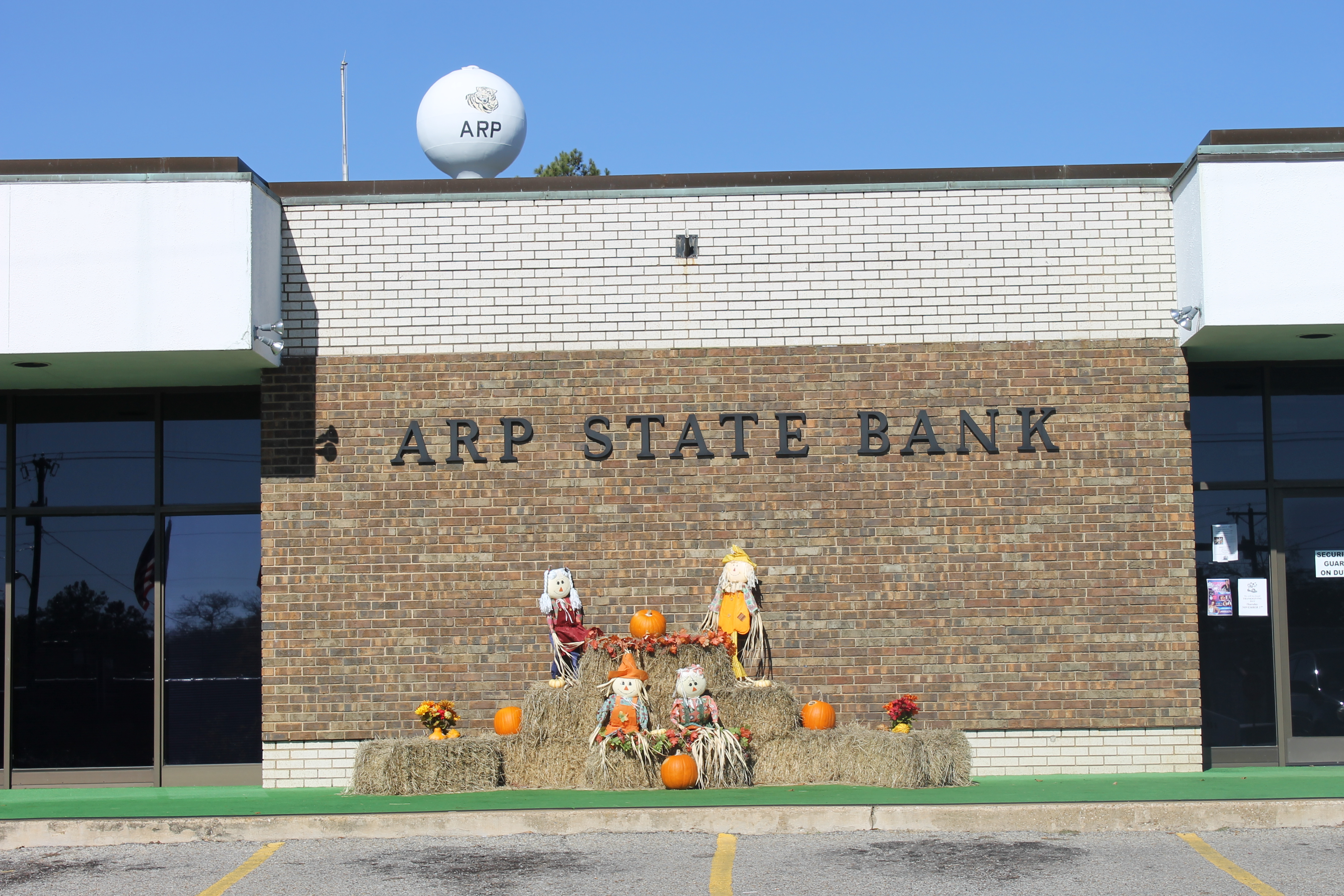
Arp State Bank at the Thanksgiving season

Arp is a city in Smith County, in the U.S. state of Texas. It is part of the Tyler metropolitan statistical area. According to the United States Census Bureau. The population was 892 in the 2020 census.

== History ==
The settlement was called Bissa, from the Choctaw/Chickasaw word for blackberry, as early as the 1800s. It was later called Jarvis Junction and then Strawberry, after the fruit that was grown in the area. It was finally renamed "Arp" for Bill Arp (pen name of Charles Henry Smith), a Georgia humorist who was nationally known in the late 19th century. Supposedly, the three-letter name was also chosen for its brevity, which allowed local strawberry producers to spend less time hand-marking their crates.

== Geography ==
According to the United States Census Bureau, the city has a total area of 2.5 square miles (6.3 km^{2}), all land.

== Demographics ==
Historical population
Census	Pop.	Note	%±
1940	1,139		—
1950	909		−20.2%
1960	812		−10.7%
1970	816		0.5%
1980	939		15.1%
1990	812		−13.5%
2000	901		11.0%
2010	970		7.7%
2020	892		−8.0%
U.S. Decennial Census

=== 2020 census ===
As of the 2020 census, Arp had a population of 892 and a median age of 37.2 years, with 25.8% of residents under the age of 18 and 16.7% aged 65 or older; there were 87.0 males for every 100 females and 86.0 males for every 100 females age 18 and over.

All 892 residents lived in rural areas while 0% lived in urban areas according to the 2020 census counts.

There were 350 households in Arp, of which 42.6% had children under the age of 18 living in them, 49.1% were married-couple households, 16.3% were households with a male householder and no spouse or partner present, and 28.0% were households with a female householder and no spouse or partner present; 23.4% of all households were made up of individuals and 11.2% had someone living alone who was 65 years of age or older.

There were 407 housing units, of which 14.0% were vacant; among occupied units, 76.6% were owner-occupied and 23.4% were renter-occupied, with a homeowner vacancy rate of 1.8% and a rental vacancy rate of 5.7%.

Racial composition as of the 2020 census
Race	Percent
White	83.3%
Black or African American	4.3%
American Indian and Alaska Native	1.2%
Asian	0.1%
Native Hawaiian and Other Pacific Islander	0.4%
Some other race	3.1%
Two or more races	7.5%
Hispanic or Latino (of any race)	10.7%

Arp racial composition as of 2020 (NH = Non-Hispanic) (Note: Note: the US Census treats Hispanic/Latino as an ethnic category. This table excludes Latinos from the racial categories and assigns them to a separate category. Hispanics/Latinos can be of any race.)
Race	Number	Percentage
White (NH)	721	80.83%
Black or African American (NH)	37	4.15%
Native American or Alaska Native (NH)	8	0.9%
Asian (NH)	1	0.11%
Pacific Islander (NH)	4	0.45%
Mixed/Multi-Racial (NH)	26	2.91%
Hispanic or Latino	95	10.65%
Total	892	

=== 2010 census ===
As of the 2010 census, there were 970 people, 361 households, and 259 families residing in the city. The population density was 367.6 inhabitants per square mile (141.9/km^{2}). There were 405 housing units at an average density of 165.2 per square mile (63.8/km^{2}).

The racial makeup of the city was 95.34% White, 3.22% African American, 0.11% Native American, 0.44% from other races, and 0.89% from two or more races. Hispanic or Latino of any race were 2.55% of the population.

There were 361 households, out of which 32.1% had children under the age of 18 living with them, 59.3% were married couples living together, 8.6% had a female householder with no husband present, and 28.0% were non-families. 26.3% of all households were made up of individuals, and 13.3% had someone living alone who was 65 years of age or older. The average household size was 2.50 and the average family size was 2.97.

In the city, the population was spread out, with 25.2% under the age of 18, 8.7% from 18 to 24, 27.3% from 25 to 44, 24.0% from 45 to 64, and 14.9% who were 65 years of age or older. The median age was 37 years. For every 100 females, there were 91.7 males. For every 100 females age 18 and over, there were 89.3 males.

The median income for a household in the city was $33,750, and the median income for a family was $38,807. Males had a median income of $27,443 versus $22,202 for females. The per capita income for the city was $16,619. About 4.2% of families and 4.9% of the population were below the poverty line, including 5.5% of those under age 18 and 6.2% of those age 65 or over.

== Education ==
The City of Arp is served by the Arp Independent School District, and includes an elementary school, junior high school and high school.

== Notable people ==
- Joe B. Foster, founder of Newfield Exploration
- Guy Lewis, legendary men's basketball coach for Houston
- DeMarvion Overshown, NFL linebacker for the Dallas Cowboys
