= Consumer fraud =

Consumer fraud are deceptive practices which result in financial losses of consumers. Common fraudulent tactics include false promises and inaccurate claims, as well as outright cheating.

== Types of consumer fraud ==
The United States Office of the Comptroller of the Currency gives an advice on the fraud related to currency:

- Advance fee fraud
  - Debt elimination fraud
  - Nigerian fraud
- Cashier's check fraud
- Fictitious banking
- High yield investment fraud
- Personal data fraud; may result in credit or debit card fraud
  - Identity theft
  - Phishing

Other types of consumer fraud include:

- Bait-and-switch
- Bank fraud
- Counterfeit consumer goods
- Pharma fraud
  - COVID 19 fraud
- "Snake oil" fraud

== Legislation ==
=== United States ===
The Bureau of Consumer Protection of the United States Federal Trade Commission is established to protect consumers against unfair or deceptive acts or practices in commerce.

The Federal Trade Commission Act is the United states law, which, among other things, prohibits unfair or deceptive acts or practices affecting commerce. In particular, it legally defines the concepts of "unfairness" and "deception" with respect to consumers.

==== Illinois ====
The 1974 Consumer Fraud Act supplements the 1965 Uniform Deceptive Trade Practices Act.
