= Smart Horizons Career Online Education =

Coordinates: 26.2135°N 80.1717°W

Location
- 1280 SW 36th Ave, Suite 104; Pompano Beach, FL 33069; United States

Information
- Type: Private Online High School, Distance education, Adult education
- Established: 2010
- Status: Open
- School district: Smart Horizons Career Online Education
- Superintendent: Dr. Howard Liebman
- CEEB code: 102450
- Grades: High School
- Accreditation: AdvancED/SACS/NCA/NWAC Accredited as an Online School District
- Website: www.shcoe.org

Smart Horizons Career Online Education is an accredited online school that provides high school diplomas and career certification via online programs. The company is a for-profit school owned by Darwin Global. It describes itself as a "private, national online school district." The company’s core competency is designing, building, and managing affordable, career-based online high schools for students around the world.

Founded in 2010 and located in Ft. Lauderdale, Florida, Smart Horizons Career Online Education develops career-based high school diploma programs. The company offers career-credentialed certificates programs for several in-demand careers, such as Child Care, Commercial Driving, Criminal Justice, Office Management, and Homeland Security. All students graduate with both a high school diploma and coursework toward earning a career-credentialed certificate in one of these areas.

== Accreditation ==
Smart Horizons Career Online Education is fully accredited as an online school district by Cognia (formerly AdvancED).

== Partnership Programs ==
Smart Horizons Career Online Education designs, builds, and manages career online high schools for the following types of organizations:

- Corporations
- Public Libraries
- Post-Secondary Schools
- Adult & Career Education (K-12)
- Prison Education
- Dropout Prevention
- Workforce & Community-Based Agencies

These partnership programs are designed to develop full-service, branded career online high school programs.

== See also ==
- Smart Horizons Career Online High School
- Virtual school
