= Arp High School =

Coordinates: 32.2287°N 95.0568°W

Location
- 101 School St. Arp, Texas 75750-0070; United States

Information
- School type: Public high school
- School district: Arp Independent School District
- Principal: Mike Miller
- Staff: 30.09 (FTE)
- Grades: 9-12
- Enrollment: 302 (2023-2024)
- Student to teacher ratio: 10.04
- Colors: Maroon & White
- Athletics conference: UIL Class 3A
- Mascot: Tiger
- Yearbook: The Tiger
- Website: Arp High School

Arp High School is a public high school located in Arp, Texas, United States, and classified as a 3A school by the University Interscholastic League (UIL). It is part of the Arp Independent School District located in far southeastern Smith County. In 2015, the school was rated "Met Standard" by the Texas Education Agency.

== Athletics ==
The Arp Tigers compete in these sports -

Cross Country, Volleyball, Football, Basketball, Golf, Track, Softball & Baseball

Basketball coach Guy Lewis, an alumnus of the school, was on the basketball and football teams while a student there in the 1930s.

=== State titles ===
Arp (UIL)

  - 2006(2A) Boys Basketball
  - 2007 (2A) Boys Track

Semi-Finalist

  - 2000 (2A) Football
  - 2001 (2A) Football
  - 2016 (3A) Football

State finalist

  - 2008 (2A) Boys Basketball

Arp Industrial (PVIL) State Championship

1949 Basketball (1A) PVIL 1965 Basketball (1A) PVIL

== Notable alumni ==
- DeMarvion Overshown, NFL linebacker for the Dallas Cowboys
- Guy Lewis, successful hall of fame men’s basketball coach for the University of Houston Cougars from 1956 to 1986
