= Ernest Strahan =

American politician from Kansas (1836–1927)

Member of the Kansas State Senate from the 29th District
- In office 1957–1964

Member of the Kansas State Senate from the 30th District
- In office 1965–1968

Member of the Kansas State Senate from the 17th District
- In office 1969–1971
- Succeeded by: John Simpson

Personal details
- Born: March 1, 1901 Williamsburg, Kansas
- Died: 1971 (aged 69–70)
- Party: Republican
- Spouse: Helen Dillingham (m. February 17, 1938)

Ernest Wesley Strahan (March 1, 1901 – 1971) was a politician from the U.S. state of Kansas, who served for 14 years as a Republican in the Kansas State Senate.

Strahan resided in Salina, Kansas, where in addition to serving in the State Senate, he was a manufacturer of ice cream. In 1971, he died in office, and John M. Simpson was appointed to the State Senate to replace him.
