= Kansas Wesleyan Coyotes =

- University: Kansas Wesleyan University
- Association: NAIA
- Conference: KCAC (primary)
- Location: Salina, Kansas
- Varsity teams: 25
- Football stadium: Gene Bissell Field at the Graves Family Sports Complex
- Basketball arena: Mabee Arena
- Baseball stadium: Dean Evans Stadium
- Softball stadium: Bill Burke Park
- Soccer stadium: Gene Bissell Field at the Graves Family Sports Complex
- Nickname: Coyotes
- Colors: Purple and gold
- Website: kwucoyotes.com
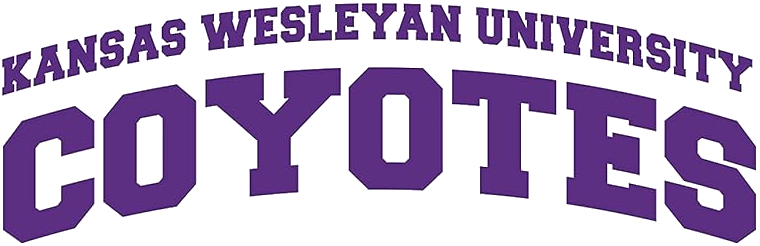

The Kansas Wesleyan Coyotes are the athletic teams that represent Kansas Wesleyan University, located in Salina, Kansas, in intercollegiate athletics as a member of the National Association of Intercollegiate Athletics (NAIA), primarily competing in the Kansas Collegiate Athletic Conference (KCAC) since the 1902–03 academic year.

== Varsity teams ==
Kansas Wesleyan competes in 20 intercollegiate varsity sports:

Men's sports	Women's sports
Baseball	Basketball
Basketball	Bowling
Bowling	Cross country
Cross country	Flag football
Football	Golf
Golf	Soccer
Soccer	Softball
Tennis	Tennis
Track and field^{1}	Track and field^{1}
Volleyball	Volleyball
^{1} – includes both indoor and outdoor

=== Football ===
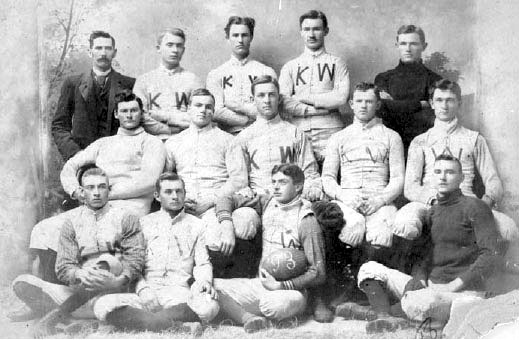
1893 KW football team

The Coyotes football program made its first appearance in 1893 with a record of four wins and one loss. They would not field a team again until 1899 when the school played one game against Kansas State Agriculture College (now known as Kansas State University) and lost by a score of 17–5. The program continued every year until 1904 when the program was suspended for one year. In all, the school did not field a team during the following years: 1894–1898, 1904, 1910–1913, 1918, and 1943–1945. As of completion of the 2009 season, the program has an all-time record of 379 wins, 377 losses, and 38 ties.

==== Bowl games ====
Kansas Wesleyan played in American Family Insurance Charity Bowl on December 12, 2000, against rival Bethany. The team lost by a score of 20–3.

== Facilities ==
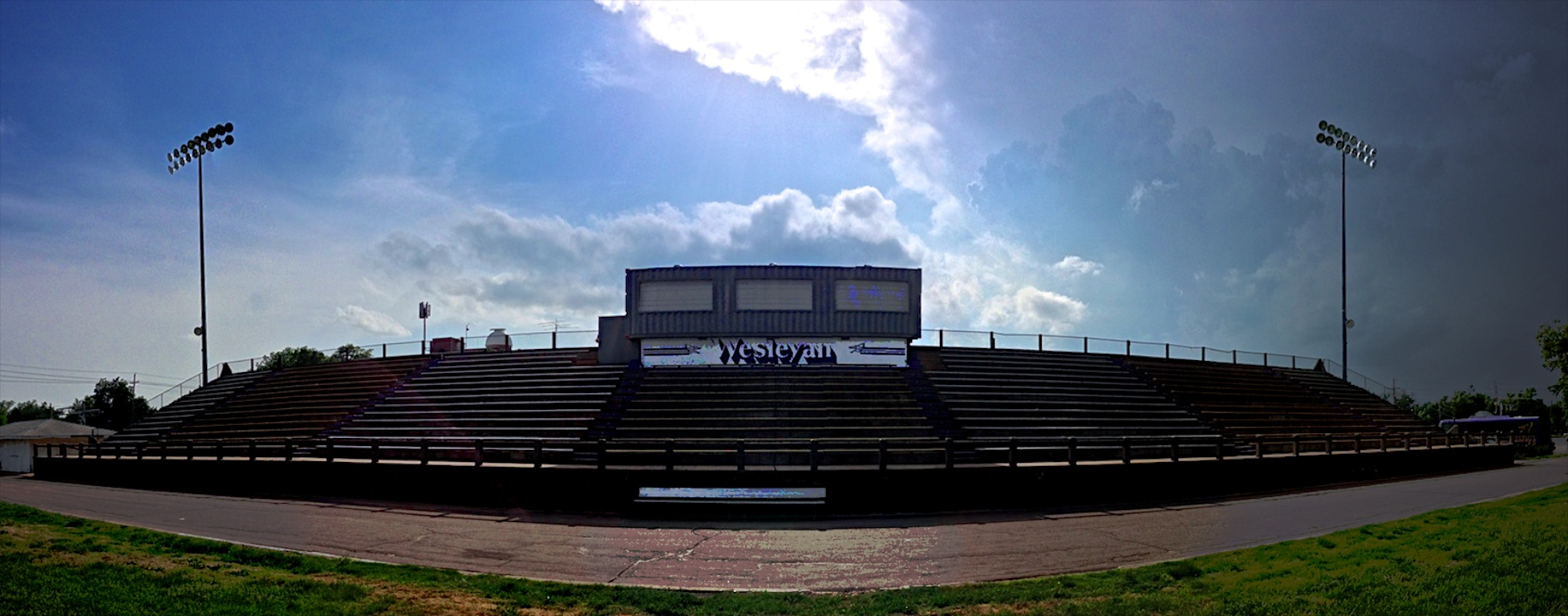
Former Glenn Martin Stadium, home to KWU football and soccer teams. The stadium was demolished in 2014 and replaced by Gene Bissell Field

Venue	Sport(s)	Open.	Ref.
Gene Bissell Field (Note: Part of the Graves Family Sports Complex.)	Football; Soccer; Track and field	2015	
Mabee Arena	Basketball	2008	
Dean Evans Stadium	Baseball	1992	
Salina South High School Fields	Softball	n/i	
Bradley Courts	Tennis	n/i	
