= Kansas Wesleyan University =

Christian university in Salina, Kansas, US

- Motto in English: Victory not without Toil
- Type: Private university
- Established: September 15, 1886; 139 years ago
- Religious affiliation: United Methodist Church
- Academic affiliations: IAMSCU; NAICU; CIC
- President: Matthew R. Thompson
- Provost: Damon Kraft
- Faculty: 84
- Students: 952
- Location: Salina, Kansas, U.S. 38°48′49″N 97°36′34″W
- Campus: Urban
- Colors: Purple and gold
- Nickname: Coyotes
- Sporting affiliations: NAIA – KCAC
- Website: kwu.edu

Kansas Wesleyan University is a private Christian university in Salina, Kansas, United States. Founded in 1886, it is affiliated with the United Methodist Church and accredited by the Higher Learning Commission. It has over 900 students and a 28-acre (11 ha) campus.

== Academics ==
The university's academic program provides a liberal arts foundation comprising more than 27 major programs granting MBA, BA, BS and BSN degrees. Additionally, the university offers online degrees in emergency management, criminal justice and the Master of Business Administration (MBA). The average class size is 13 students, and graduates have a 98% placement rate.

== Student life ==
Kansas Wesleyan has more than 20 clubs and organizations including DECA, KWU Student Media and numerous music and athletics opportunities. The Kansas Wesleyan DECA team has earned multiple world championship honors, totaling 15 since 2021.

== Campus ==
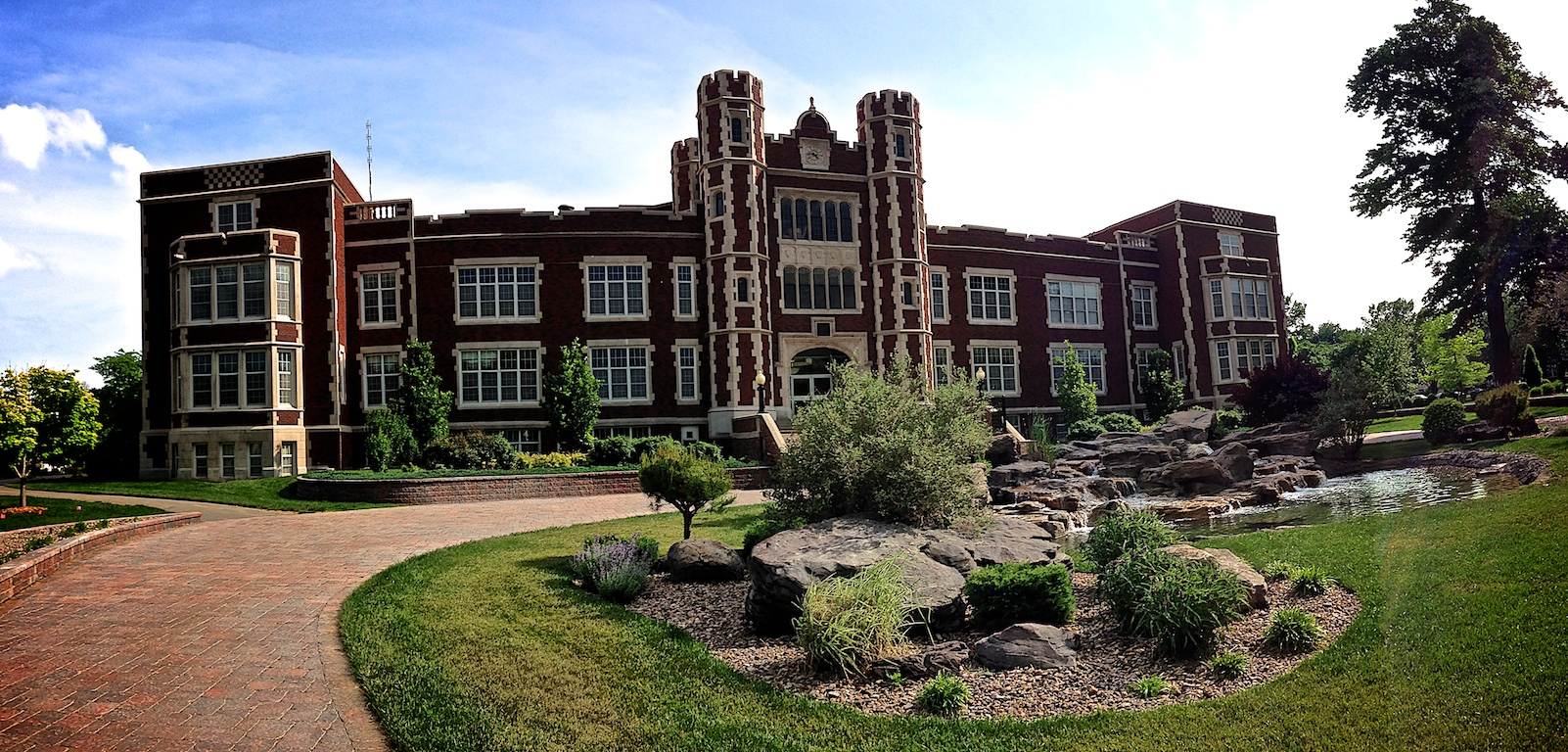
Main Building

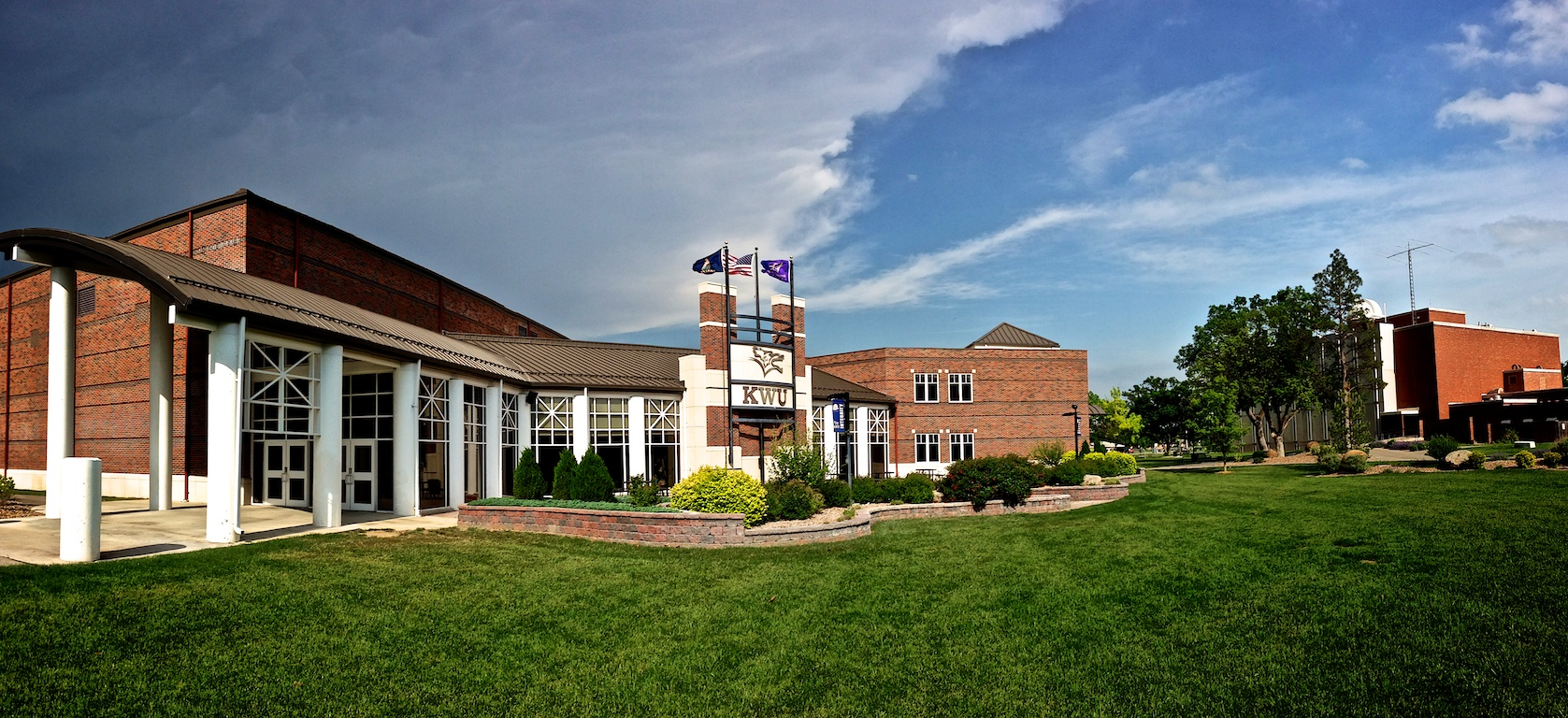
Hauptli Student Center

== Athletics ==
The Kansas Wesleyan athletic teams are called the Coyotes. The university is a member of the National Association of Intercollegiate Athletics (NAIA), primarily competing in the Kansas Collegiate Athletic Conference (KCAC) since the 1902–03 academic year.

Kansas Wesleyan competes in 24 intercollegiate varsity sports. Men's sports include baseball, basketball, bowling, cross country, football, golf, soccer, tennis, track & field (indoor and outdoor), and volleyball. Women's sports include basketball, bowling, cross country, flag football, golf, soccer, softball, tennis, track & field (indoor and outdoor), and volleyball. Co-ed sports include competitive cheer and competitive dance.

KWU athletics has won the KCAC Commissioner’s Cup five times in the award’s history, including a three-year run, winning the cup in 2022-23, 2023-24 and 2024-25.

== Notable alumni ==
- Tunku Shazuddin Ariff – deputy crown prince of Kedah
- Rebecca S. Chopp – chancellor of the University of Denver
- Thomas Craven – anti-modernist art critic and art historian
- Bill Graves – politician, 43rd governor of Kansas, and president of the American Trucking Association
- Wes Jackson – biologist and founder of The Land Institute
- Dennis Rader (better known by his pseudonym BTK (for "bind, torture, kill") – serial killer and mass murderer; attended 1965–66
- Bill Wheatley – basketball player who competed in the 1936 Summer Olympics
