= List of Alpha Psi Omega chapters =

Alpha Psi Omega is a North American honor society for participants in collegiate theatre. Delta Psi Omega is Alpha Psi Omega's junior-college division. Originally, the society called its chapters "casts".

== Alpha Psi Omega chapters ==
Alpha Psi Omega refers to its chapters as casts. In the following list of chapters, active chapters are indicated in bold and inactive chapters and institutions are in italics.

Chapter	Charter date and range	Institution	Location	Status	Ref.
**Alpha**	1925	Fairmont State University	Fairmont, West Virginia	Active	
**Beta**	1925	Marshall University	Huntington, West Virginia	Active	
Gamma (First) (see Alpha Chi and Delta Gamma)	1925–1926	Alderson Broaddus College	Philippi, West Virginia	Reestablished	
Gamma (Second)	1927 – December 1, 2014	Washington and Lee University	Lexington, Virginia	Inactive	(Note: Chapter is also called Omega Gamma Omega.)
Delta	1925 – February 1, 1958	Acadia University	Wolfville, Nova Scotia, Canada	Inactive	
**Epsilon**	1926	University of Lynchburg	Lynchburg, Virginia	Active	
Zeta	1926 – April 1, 1992	Western State College of Colorado	Gunnison, Colorado	Inactive	
Eta (First) (see Omega Eta Alpha)	xxxx ? – August 1, 1925	Fort Lewis College	Durango, Colorado	Reestablished	
Eta (Second) (see Omega Eta Omega)	1926 ?–19xx ?	College of Idaho	Caldwell, Idaho	Reestablished	
**Eta (Third)** (see Alpha Tau (First))		University of Richmond	Richmond, Virginia	Active	
Theta (First)	May 24, 1926 – 19xxx ?	Missouri Wesleyan College	Cameron, Missouri	Inactive	
Theta (Second)	xxxx ? – October 1, 2011	Baker University	Baldwin City, Kansas	Inactive	(Note: Chapter formed at Missouri Wesleyan College, which merged with Baker University in 1926.)
Iota (First)	1926– 1927?	Columbus College	Sioux Falls, South Dakota	Inactive	(Note: The college closed in 1929.)
Iota (Second)	1927–19xx ?	University of Maryland	College Park, Maryland	Inactive	
Iota (Third)	19xx ? – February 1, 1983	Johns Hopkins University	Baltimore, Maryland	Inactive	
Kappa (First)	1926–1927 ?	North Texas State Teachers College	Denton, Texas	Inactive	
Kappa (Second)	1927 – March 1, 2014	Ottawa University	Ottawa, Kansas	Inactive	
**Lambda (First)**	1926	Kentucky Wesleyan College	Winchester, Kentucky	Active	
**Lambda (Second)** (see Beta Delta First)		Washington & Jefferson College	Washington, Pennsylvania	Active	
Mu (First)	1926–1927	Tabor College	Tabor, Iowa	Inactive	(Note: The college closed in 1927.)
Mu (Second)	1927–1939; xxxx ? – September 1, 2014	University of Texas at Austin	Austin, Texas	Inactive	
Mu (Third)	19xx ? – June 1, 1985	University of Miami	Coral Gables, Florida	Inactive	
Mu (Fourth)		Midland University	Fremont, Nebraska	Inactive	
Nu (First)	1926–19xx ?	Western Union College	Le Mars, Iowa	Inactive	
Nu (Second)	19xx? – April 1, 2014	University of Houston	Houston, Texas	Inactive	
Xi	October 16, 1926 – June 1, 2003	California State University, Chico	Chico, California	Inactive	
Omicron (First)	June 1926 – May 1, 1961	Wilmington College	Wilmington, Ohio	Inactive	(Note: Chapter formed from the Wilmington College Players Club.)
Omicron (Second)	xxxx ? – June 1, 2012	University of Louisiana at Monroe	Monroe, Louisiana	Inactive	
**Pi (First)**	1926	Wofford College	Spartanburg, South Carolina	Active	
Pi (Second)	19xx ? – October 1, 2010	West Virginia University	Morgantown, West Virginia	Inactive	
Rho (First)	1926–1927 ?	Central Normal College	Danville, Indiana	Inactive	(Note: The college closed in 1945.)
Rho (Second)	1927– July 1, 1978	Lincoln Memorial University	Harrogate, Tennessee	Inactive	
Sigma	1926 – January 1, 2010	Linfield College	McMinnville, Oregon	Inactive	
Tau (First)	1926–1927 ?	State Normal School at Cheney	Cheney, Washington	Inactive	(Note: The institution was formed as the State Normal School at Cheney. It became the Eastern Washington College of Education in 1937, Eastern Washington State College in 1961, and Eastern Washington University in 1977.)
Tau (Second)	1927 – Present	Texas Tech University	Lubbock, Texas	Active	
Upsilon	October 1926 – September 1, 1996	Kansas Wesleyan University	Salina, Kansas	Inactive	
Phi	1926 – March 1, 2020	University of Northern Colorado	Greeley, Colorado	Inactive	
Chi	1926 – August 1, 2009	Buena Vista University	Storm Lake, Iowa	Inactive	
Psi	1927 – February 1, 2015	Lindenwood University	St. Charles, Missouri	Inactive	
Omega	1927 – October 1, 1979	Iowa Wesleyan College	Mount Pleasant, Iowa	Inactive	
Alpha Alpha (First) (see Omega Alpha Alpha)	1927 – 19xx ?	Concordia College	Moorhead, Minnesota	Reestablished	
**Alpha Alpha**	1927 –	University of Mississippi	University, Mississippi	Active	
Alpha Beta	1927 – April 1, 2008	Coker College	Hartsville, South Carolina	Inactive	
Alpha Gamma	1927 – May 1, 2016	Morningside University	Sioux City, Iowa	Inactive	
Alpha Delta	1927 – June 1, 1969	Tarkio College	Tarkio, Missouri	Inactive	
Alpha Epsilon (First) (see Alpha Theta Nu)	1927–xxxx ?	Westminster College	Fulton, Missouri	Inactive	
Alpha Epsilon (Second)	xxxx ? – April 1, 2022	William Woods University	Fulton, Missouri	Inactive	
**Alpha Zeta**	1927	Central College	Pella, Iowa	Active	
Alpha Eta (First)	1927–xxxx ?	Moorhead State Teachers College	Moorhead, Minnesota	Inactive	
Alpha Eta (Second)	xxxx ? – November 1, 1995	Geneva College	Beaver Falls, Pennsylvania	Inactive	
Alpha Theta	1927 – April 1, 2006	McKendree University	Lebanon, Illinois	Inactive	
Alpha Iota (First)	1927–19xx ?	Central Wesleyan College	Warrenton, Missouri	Inactive	(Note: The college closed in 1945.)
**Alpha Iota (Second)**	19xx ?	Berea College	Berea, Kentucky	Active	
Alpha Kappa (First)	1927–xxxx ?	Washington University in St. Louis	St. Louis, Missouri	Inactive	
Alpha Kappa (Second)	19xx ? – November 1, 2019	University of Tampa	Tampa, Florida	Inactive	
Alpha Lambda	1927 – October 1, 1971	University of Wisconsin–Superior	Superior, Wisconsin	Inactive	
Alpha Mu	1927 – April 1, 2022	Emory and Henry College	Emory, Virginia	Inactive	
**Alpha Nu**	1927	Colgate University	Hamilton, New York	Active	
**Alpha Xi (Mask & Dagger)**	1927	Lyon College	Batesville, Arkansas	Active	(Note: Chapter was formed at Arkansas College, which became Lyon College in 1994.)
Alpha Omicron	1927 – July 1, 2013	Bloomsburg University of Pennsylvania	Bloomsburg, Pennsylvania	Inactive	
**Alpha Pi**	April 1928	Millsaps College	Jackson, Mississippi	Active	
Alpha Rho	1928 – April 1, 2016	West Virginia Wesleyan College	Buckhannon, West Virginia	Inactive	
Alpha Sigma (First)	1928–19xx ?	California State University, Fresno	Fresno, California	Inactive	
Alpha Sigma (Second)	1928 – June 1, 2002	Louisiana College	Pineville, Louisiana	Inactive	
Alpha Tau (First) (see Eta Third)	1928 – xxxx ?	University of Richmond	Richmond, Virginia	Reestablished	
Alpha Tau (Second)	1928 – June 1, 2010	Mount Union College	Alliance, Ohio	Inactive	
Alpha Upsilon	1928–xxxx ?	Cotner College	Lincoln, Nebraska	Inactive	(Note: The college closed in 1933.)
**Alpha Upsilon (Second)**		Williams Baptist University	Walnut Ridge, Arkansas	Active	
Alpha Phi (First) (see Omega Alpha Phi)	1928–19xx ?	Taylor University	Upland, Indiana	Reestablished	
Alpha Phi (Second)	1928 – February 1, 1968	University of Wisconsin–La Crosse	La Crosse, Wisconsin	Inactive	
Alpha Chi (see Gamma First and Delta Gamma)	1928–19xx ?	Broaddus College	Philippi, West Virginia	Reestablished	
Alpha Psi (see Alpha Eta Delta)	1928–xxxx ?	Temple University	Philadelphia, Pennsylvania	Inactive	
**Alpha Omega**	1928 – June 1, 2014	Augustana College	Rock Island, Illinois	Active	
Beta Alpha	1928 – September 1, 2009	Humboldt State University	Arcata, California	Inactive	
Beta Beta (First)	1925 ? – August 1, 1925	Wesleyan University	Middletown, Connecticut	Inactive	
Beta Beta (Second) (see **Alpha Eta Nu**)	1928 –	Lafayette College	Easton, Pennsylvania	Reestablished	
**Beta Gamma**	1928	Bethany College	Bethany, West Virginia	Active	
Beta Delta (First) (see **Lambda (Second)**)	1928 – xxxx ?	Washington & Jefferson College	Washington, Pennsylvania	Reestablished	
Beta Delta (Second)	1928 – May 1, 1995	New York University Washington Square and University College	New York City, New York	Inactive	
Beta Epsilon	1928–1941; 1945 – September 1, 1986	Rutgers University–New Brunswick	New Brunswick, New Jersey	Inactive	(Note: The chapter closed during World War II.)
Beta Zeta (First) (see Alpha Theta Theta)	1928 – February 1, 1968	University at Buffalo	Buffalo, New York	Inactive	
Beta Zeta (Second)	1928 – February 1, 2016	East Central University	Ada, Oklahoma	Inactive	
Beta Eta	1928 – May 1, 2004	Huntingdon College	Montgomery, Alabama	Inactive	(Note: Chapter formed at the Woman's College of Alabama, now Huntingdon College.)
Beta Theta (First) (see Alpha Gamma Tau)	1928–xxxx ?	University of Georgia	Athens, Georgia	Inactive	
Beta Theta (Second)	xxxx ? – July 1, 1972	Illinois State University	Normal, Illinois	Inactive	
Beta Iota	1928 – April 1, 2016	Valparaiso University	Valparaiso, Indiana	Inactive	
Beta Kappa	1928 – June 1, 1999	Upper Iowa University	Fayette, Iowa	Inactive	
Beta Lambda	1928 – May 1, 1934	University of Delaware	Newark, Delaware	Inactive	
Beta Mu (First) (see Omega Beta Mu)	1928 – January 1, 1987	Gustavus Adolphus College	St. Peter, Minnesota	Reestablished	
**Beta Mu (Second)**	1928	Union University	Jackson, Tennessee	Active	
Beta Nu	1929 – October 1, 2017	Northern Arizona University	Flagstaff, Arizona	Inactive	
**Beta Xi**	April 1, 1929	Concord University	Athens, West Virginia	Active	
Beta Omicron (First)	1929–19xx ?	State Normal School	Athens, Georgia	Inactive	(Note: In 1932, the normal school was taken over by the University of Georgia and became known as Coordinate College.)
**Beta Omicron (Second)**	1929	California University of Pennsylvania	California, Pennsylvania	Active	
Beta Pi (First)	1929–193x ?	Middlebury College	Middlebury, Vermont	Inactive	
Beta Pi (Second)	193x ? – May 1, 2018	William Jewell College	Liberty, Missouri	Inactive	
Beta Rho (see Omega Beta Rho)	1929 – November 1, 1989	Wayne State College	Wayne, Nebraska	Inactive	(Note: Chapter formed at Nebraska State Teachers College, now Wayne State College.)
Beta Sigma (First)	1929–19xx ?	North Dakota State Teachers College	Mayville, North Dakota	Inactive	
Beta Sigma (Second)	xxxx ? – June 1, 2014	Taylor University	Upland, Indiana	Inactive	
Beta Tau (First)	1929 – June 1, 1953	University of the South	Sewanee, Tennessee	Inactive	
Beta Tau (Second)	1929 – May 1, 2013	Newberry College	Newberry, South Carolina	Inactive	
Beta Upsilon	1929 – July 1, 1973	Western New Mexico University	Silver City, New Mexico	Inactive	
**Beta Phi**	1929	Stephen F. Austin State University	Nacogdoches, Texas	Active	
Beta Chi (First)	1929 – February 1, 1995	Defiance College	Defiance, Ohio	Inactive	
Beta Chi (Second)	19xx ? – May 1, 1966	University of Cincinnati	Cincinnati, Ohio	Inactive	
**Beta Psi**	1929	Kent State University	Kent, Ohio	Active	
Beta Omega	1930 – April 1, 1984	Keuka College	Keuka Park, New York	Inactive	
**Gamma Alpha**	1930	Southeastern Oklahoma State University	Durant, Oklahoma	Active	
Gamma Beta	1930 – May 1, 1980	Trinity University	San Antonio, Texas	Inactive	
Gamma Gamma (First)	1930 – May 1, 2016	William Carey University	Hattiesburg, Mississippi	Inactive	(Note: Chapter formed at the Mississippi Women's College, now William Carey University.)
**Gamma Gamma (Second)**	1930 – October 1, 2023	University of Alabama	Tuscaloosa, Alabama	Active	
Gamma Delta	1930 – May 1, 1971	New Mexico Highlands University	Las Vegas, New Mexico	Inactive	
Gamma Epsilon (First)	1930–xxxx ?	Henderson State College	Arkadelphia, Arkansas	Inactive	
Gamma Epsilon (Second)	1930 – May 1, 2016	Murray State University	Murray, Kentucky	Inactive	
Gamma Zeta (First) (see **Oklahoma Gamma**)	1930–xxxx ?	Oklahoma City University	Oklahoma City, Oklahoma	Reestablished	
Gamma Zeta (Second)	19xx ? – June 1, 2007	Colorado State University	Fort Collins, Colorado	Inactive	
**Gamma Eta**	1930 – May 1, 2024	Lenoir–Rhyne University	Hickory, North Carolina	Active	
Gamma Theta	1930 – April 1, 2010	University of Indianapolis	Indianapolis, Indiana	Inactive	(Note: Chapter formed at Indiana Central College, now the University of Indianapolis.)
Gamma Iota	1930 – January 1, 2004	Sul Ross State University	Alpine, Texas	Inactive	
**Gamma Kappa**	1930	Pennsylvania Western University, Edinboro	Edinboro, Pennsylvania	Active	
Gamma Lambda	1930 – February 1, 2004	Baylor University	Waco, Texas	Inactive	
Gamma Mu	1930 – November 1, 1983	Muhlenberg College	Allentown, Pennsylvania	Inactive	
Gamma Nu (First)	1930 – July 1, 1990	University of Rochester	Rochester, New York	Inactive	
Gamma Nu (Second) (see Omega Gamma Nu)	1931–19xx ?	Georgia State University	Atlanta, Georgia	Reestablished	
Gamma Xi	xxxx ? – May 1, 1980	Dickinson State College	Dickinson, North Dakota	Inactive	
Gamma Omicron	1931 – June 1, 1957	Shurtleff College	Alton, Illinois	Inactive	(Note: The college closed in 1957.)
Gamma Pi	1931 – February 1, 1986	Tift College	Forsyth, Georgia	Inactive	(Note: The college merged with Mercer University in 1987.)
Gamma Rho (First)	1931 – January 1, 1996	Northwestern Oklahoma State University	Alva, Oklahoma	Inactive	
**Gamma Rho (Second)**		Livingstone College	Salisbury, North Carolina	Active	
Gamma Sigma	1931–xxxx ?	Cascade College	Portland, Oregon	Inactive	
Gamma Tau	1931 – April 1, 2016	University of South Carolina	Columbia, South Carolina	Inactive	
Gamma Upsilon (First) (see Alpha Iota Beta)	1931–xxxx ?	Northern Illinois University	DeKalb, Illinois	Inactive	
**Gamma Upsilon (Second)**	19xx ? – March 1, 2004	State University of New York at Cortland	Cortland, New York	Active	
Gamma Phi	1931 – October 1, 1979	Rocky Mountain College	Billings, Montana	Inactive	
Gamma Chi	1931 – January 1, 2014	Southwestern Oklahoma State University	Weatherford, Oklahoma	Inactive	
**Gamma Psi (First)**	1931	Roanoke College	Salem, Virginia	Active	
Gamma Psi (Second)	xxxx – June 1, 2021	Santa Clara University	Santa Clara, California	Inactive	
Gamma Omega	1931 – June 1, 1978	Montana State University	Bozeman, Montana	Inactive	
Delta Alpha	19xx ? – October 1, 1968	University of New Brunswick	Fredericton, New Brunswick, Canada	Inactive	
**Delta Beta**	1932	Alma College	Alma, Michigan	Active	
Delta Gamma (see Gamma First and Alpha Chi)	1932 – February 1, 2002	Alderson-Broaddus College	Philippi, West Virginia	Inactive	
Delta Delta	1932 – April 1, 2007	Hampden–Sydney College	Hampden Sydney, Virginia	Inactive	
Delta Epsilon	1932 – March 1, 2021	North Central College	Naperville, Illinois	Inactive	(Note: Chapter was also called North Central College Theatre.)
Delta Zeta	1932 – May 1, 1975	University of Dubuque	Dubuque, Iowa	Inactive	
Delta Eta	1932 – May 1, 1980	Northwestern State University	Natchitoches, Louisiana	Inactive	
Delta Theta	1933 – June 6, 2003	Minot State University	Minot, North Dakota	Inactive	
Delta Iota (First) (see Omega Delta Iota)	1933–19xx ?	Centenary College of Louisiana	Shreveport, Louisiana	Reestablished	
**Delta Iota (Second)**	1931 - 1959, 1983	Ouachita Baptist University	Arkadelphia, Arkansas	Active	
Delta Kappa	1933 – July 1, 2012	University of Mary Hardin–Baylor	Belton, Texas	Inactive	
Delta Lambda (First) (see Omega Delta Lambda)	1933–19xx ?; 1961 – September 1, 1989	Northwestern College	Orange City, Iowa	Reestablished	
Delta Lambda (Second)	1933 ?– April 1, 2021	Arizona State University	Phoenix, Arizona	Inactive	
Delta Mu	1933 – May 1, 2018	Winthrop University	Rock Hill, South Carolina	Inactive	
Delta Nu	1933 – June 1, 2021	Florida Southern College	Lakeland, Florida	Inactive	
Delta Xi	1933 – October 1, 2013	Rensselaer Polytechnic Institute	Troy, New York	Inactive	
Delta Omicron	1934 – December 1, 2016	Doane University	Crete, Nebraska	Inactive	
Delta Pi	1934 – June 1, 2003	California Polytechnic State University, San Luis Obispo	San Luis Obispo, California	Inactive	
Delta Rho (First)	1934 – April 1, 1992	Russell Sage College	Troy, New York	Inactive	
Delta Rho (Second)	xxxx ? – August 1, 1925	Trinity College	Hartford, Connecticut	Inactive	
Delta Rho (Third)		Wesleyan University	Middletown, Connecticut	Inactive	
Delta Rho (Fourth)	xxxx ? – September 1, 2017	Angelo State University	San Angelo, Texas	Inactive	
Delta Sigma	1934 – May 1, 1975	Bethel College	North Newton, Kansas	Inactive	
**Delta Tau**	1934 – March 1, 2024	Ursinus College	Collegeville, Pennsylvania	Active	
**Delta Upsilon**	1934 – August 1, 2023	Texas Christian University	Fort Worth, Texas	Active	
**Delta Phi (First)**	1934	Slippery Rock University	Slippery Rock, Pennsylvania	Active	
Delta Phi (Second)	xxxx ? – May 1, 2008	Mississippi University for Women	Columbus, Mississippi	Inactive	
Delta Chi	1934 – December 1, 1996	Oklahoma Panhandle State University	Goodwell, Oklahoma	Inactive	
Delta Psi (see **Eta Pi**)	1934 –xxxx ?	Mississippi State University	Starkville, Mississippi	Reestablished	
Delta Omega	1934	Judson University	Elgin, Illinois	Inactive	
Epsilon Alpha	19xx ? – March 1, 2018	Elmira College	Elmira, New York	Inactive	
Epsilon Beta	19xx ? – January 1, 1920	Eisenhower College	Seneca Falls, New York	Inactive	
Epsilon Gamma	19xx ? – May 1, 2012	Eureka College	Eureka, Illinois	Inactive	
Epsilon Delta	19xx ? – January 1, 2008	Arkansas Tech University	Russellville, Arkansas	Inactive	
Epsilon Epsilon	19xx ? – March 1, 2003	Stern College for Women	Manhattan, New York	Inactive	
Epsilon Zeta	19xx ? – January 1, 1990	University of Alaska Anchorage	Anchorage, Alaska	Inactive	
Epsilon Theta	19xx ? – May 1, 1981	Tufts University	Medford, Massachusetts	Inactive	
Zeta Alpha	1935 – December 1, 2015	Abilene Christian University	Abilene, Texas	Inactive	
Zeta Beta	1935 – November 1, 2002	University of Wisconsin–Stout	Menomonie, Wisconsin	Inactive	
**Zeta Gamma**	1935	Simpson College	Indianola, Iowa	Active	
Zeta Delta	1935 – February 1, 2017	University of Central Arkansas	Conway, Arkansas	Inactive	(Note: Chapter formed at Arkansas State Teachers College, now the University of Central Arkansas.)
Zeta Epsilon	1935 – April 1, 2003	Delta State University	Cleveland, Mississippi	Inactive	
Zeta Zeta	1935 – August 1, 2017	Bethany College	Lindsborg, Kansas	Inactive	
**Zeta Eta**	1935	Norwich University	Northfield, Vermont	Active	
**Zeta Theta**	1935	Hardin–Simmons University	Abilene, Texas	Active	
Zeta Iota (First)	1935 – December 1, 1961	Drexel Institute of Technology	Philadelphia, Pennsylvania	Inactive	
Zeta Iota (Second)	xxxx – November 1, 2007	California State University, East Bay	Hayward, California	Inactive	
Zeta Kappa	1935 – May 1, 1980	College of the Ozarks	Clarksville, Arkansas	Inactive	
Zeta Lambda (see Omega Zeta Lambda)	1935 – 19xx ?	Central Methodist University	Fayette, Missouri	Reestablished	
Zeta Lambda	19xx ? – June 1, 1985	Peru State College	Peru, Nebraska	Inactive	
**Zeta Mu (Ohio Zeta)**	1936 – May 1, 2021	Ashland University	Ashland, Ohio	Active	
Zeta Nu (First) (see Omega Zeta Nu)	1936 – 19xx ?	State University of New York at Geneseo	Geneseo, New York	Reestablished	
Zeta Nu	19xx ? – March 1, 1954	Armstrong College	Berkeley, California	Inactive	
**Zeta Xi**	1936	University of La Verne	La Verne, California	Active	
Zeta Omicron	1936 – May 1, 2011	Hendrix College	Conway, Arkansas	Inactive	
**Zeta Pi**	1936	Mercer University	Macon, Georgia	Active	
**Zeta Rho**	1936	University of North Alabama	Florence, Alabama	Active	
Zeta Sigma	1936 – May 1, 2010	Stonehill College	Easton, Massachusetts	Inactive	
Zeta Tau	1936 – March 1, 1986	University of Texas at El Paso	El Paso, Texas	Inactive	
**Zeta Upsilon**	1936	Heidelberg College	Tiffin, Ohio	Active	
Zeta Phi	1936 – October 1, 2012	Eastern Kentucky University	Richmond, Kentucky	Inactive	
**Zeta Chi**	1936	Union Commonwealth University	Barbourville, Kentucky	Active	
**Zeta Psi (Indiana Zeta)**	1937	Ball State University	Muncie, Indiana	Active	
Zeta Psi (Second)	xxxx ? – April 1, 2007	Tri-State College	Angola, Indiana	Inactive	
Zeta Omega	19xx ? – March 1, 1994	Lewis University	Romeoville, Illinois	Inactive	
Eta Alpha	1937 – January 1, 2022	Marietta College	Marietta, Ohio	Inactive	
Eta Beta	1937 – September 1, 2014	Carson–Newman University	Jefferson City, Tennessee	Inactive	
Eta Gamma	1937 – November 1, 2002	Virginia Tech	Blacksburg, Virginia	Inactive	
Eta Delta	1937 – December 1, 1982	University of Wisconsin–Stevens Point	Stevens Point, Wisconsin	Inactive	
Eta Epsilon (First)	1937 – April 1, 1961	Spring Hill College	Mobile, Alabama	Inactive	
Eta Epsilon (Second) (see Omega Eta Epsilon)	19xx ? – October 1, 1973	Chaminade College	Honolulu, Hawaii	Reestablished	
Eta Zeta	1937–19xx ?	Upsala College	East Orange, New Jersey	Inactive	(Note: The college closed in 1995.)
**Eta Eta**	1937 – September 1, 2023	University of Mary Washington	Fredericksburg, Virginia	Active	
Eta Theta	1938 – April 1, 1991	Washburn University	Topeka, Kansas	Inactive	
Eta Iota	1938 – May 1, 2000	West Texas A&M University	Canyon, Texas	Inactive	(Note: Chapter formed at West Texas State Teachers College, now West Texas A&M University.)
Eta Kappa (First) (see Omega Eta Kappa)	1938 – June 1, 1974	Northern Montana College	Havre, Montana	Reestablished	
**Eta Kappa (Second)**		York University	York, Nebraska	Active	
Eta Lambda	1938 – April 1, 1980	Eastern Montana College	Billings, Montana	Inactive	
Eta Mu	1938 – June 1, 1984	University of Arkansas at Little Rock	Little Rock, Arkansas	Inactive	
**Eta Nu**	1938	Meredith College	Raleigh, North Carolina	Active	
**Eta Xi**	1938	Thiel College	Greenville, Pennsylvania	Active	
Eta Omicron	1938 – January 1, 2015	Carthage College	Kenosha, Wisconsin	Inactive	
**Eta Pi** (see Delta Psi)	1939	Mississippi State University	Mississippi State, Mississippi	Active	
**Eta Rho**	1939	West Liberty University	West Liberty, West Virginia	Active	
**Eta Sigma**	1939	Troy University	Troy, Alabama	Active	
Eta Tau (First) (see Nu Tau)	1939–19xx ?	Carroll University	Waukesha, Wisconsin	Reestablished	
Eta Tau (Second)	19xx ? – April 1, 2000	University of Florida	Gainesville, Florida	Inactive	
**Eta Upsilon**	1939	Bridgewater College	Bridgewater, Virginia	Active	
Eta Phi	1939 – May 1, 2020	Youngstown State University	Youngstown, Ohio	Inactive	
Eta Chi	1939 – May 1, 1958	Furman University	Greenville, South Carolina	Inactive	
Eta Psi	1940 – June 1, 2014	Pacific University	Forest Grove, Oregon	Inactive	
Eta Omega	1940 – March 1, 2010	Harding University	Searcy, Arkansas	Inactive	
Theta Alpha	1940 – May 1, 2016	Glenville State University	Glenville, West Virginia	Inactive	
**Theta Beta**	1940	Georgia College & State University	Milledgeville, Georgia	Active	
Theta Gamma	1940 – June 1, 2010	LaGrange College	LaGrange, Georgia	Inactive	
Theta Delta	1940 – May 1, 1954	University of Tennessee	Knoxville, Tennessee	Inactive	
Theta Epsilon	1940 – June 1, 2014	McPherson College	McPherson, Kansas	Inactive	
**Theta Zeta**	1940 – April 1, 2024	Lock Haven University of Pennsylvania	Lock Haven, Pennsylvania	Active	
Theta Eta	1940 – June 1, 2004	Hood College	Frederick, Maryland	Inactive	
Theta Theta	1940 – September 1, 2014	Waynesburg University	Waynesburg, Pennsylvania	Inactive	
Theta Iota	1941 – May 1, 1994	Western Carolina University	Cullowhee, North Carolina	Inactive	
Theta Kappa	1941 – November 1, 1969	San Francisco State University	San Francisco, California	Inactive	
Theta Lambda	1941 – January 1, 2017	Georgia Southern University	Statesboro, Georgia	Inactive	
Theta Mu	1941 – May 1, 1971	University of Minnesota Duluth	Duluth, Minnesota	Inactive	
Theta Nu	1941 – September 1, 2003	Oakland City College	Oakland City, Indiana	Inactive	
Theta Xi (First)	1941–xxxx ?	George Peabody College for Teachers	Nashville, Tennessee	Inactive	
Theta Xi (Second)	19xx ? – May 1, 1969	University of the District of Columbia	Washington, D.C.	Inactive	
**Theta Omicron**	1941	Texas Wesleyan University	Fort Worth, Texas	Active	
**Theta Pi**	1942	Pacific Lutheran University	Tacoma, Washington	Active	
Theta Rho	1942 – June 1, 1975	Whitworth College	Spokane, Washington	Inactive	
Theta Sigma	1942 – February 1, 2010	Missouri Valley College	Marshall, Missouri	Inactive	
Theta Tau	1942 – April 1, 1995	University of Southwestern Louisiana	Lafayette, Louisiana	Inactive	
Theta Upsilon	1942 – March 1, 2008	Radford University	Radford, Virginia	Inactive	
**Theta Phi**	1942	Susquehanna University	Selinsgrove, Pennsylvania	Active	
Theta Chi	1942 – April 1, 2017	Eastern Oregon University	La Grande, Oregon	Inactive	
Theta Psi (First)	1942 – May 1, 2021	Hastings College	Hastings, Nebraska	Inactive	
**Theta Psi (Second)**		Augustana University	Sioux Falls, South Dakota	Active	
Theta Omega	1943 – December 1, 2020	State University of New York at Fredonia	Fredonia, New York	Inactive	
Iota Alpha	1943 – May 1, 2013	University of North Carolina at Pembroke	Pembroke, North Carolina	Inactive	
Iota Beta	1943 – November 1, 2010	University of Wisconsin–River Falls	River Falls, Wisconsin	Inactive	
**Iota Gamma**	1943 – April 1, 2023	Cedar Crest College	Allentown, Pennsylvania	Active	
Iota Delta	1943 – January 1, 1994	McMurry University	Abilene, Texas	Inactive	
**Iota Epsilon**	1944	Texas State University	San Marcos, Texas	Active	
Iota Zeta	1944 – May 1, 1998	Mercyhurst College	Erie, Pennsylvania	Inactive	
Iota Eta	1944 – February 1, 1980	C. W. Post College	Greenvale, New York	Inactive	
Iota Theta	April 1, 2003	Moravian University	Bethlehem, Pennsylvania	Inactive	
Iota Iota	1944 – August 1, 2014	Sam Houston State University	Huntsville, Texas	Inactive	
Iota Kappa (First)	19xx ? – May 1, 1947	Macalester College	Saint Paul, Minnesota	Inactive	
Iota Kappa (Second)	1944 – May 1, 2000	Davidson College	Davidson, North Carolina	Inactive	
Iota Lambda	1944 – June 1, 1991	Teikyo Westmar College	Le Mars, Iowa	Inactive	(Note: The college closed in 1997.)
Iota Mu	1944 – December 1, 2012	University of Arkansas at Pine Bluff	Pine Bluff, Arkansas	Inactive	
Iota Nu	October 1, 2006	Immaculata University	Immaculala, Pennsylvania	Inactive	
Iota Xi	1944 – July 1, 1972; xxxx ? – July 1, 2009	University of the Incarnate Word	San Antonio, Texas	Inactive	
Iota Omicron	1945 – March 1, 2019	East Stroudsburg University of Pennsylvania	East Stroudsburg, Pennsylvania	Inactive	
Iota Pi	1945 – June 1, 2010	Our Lady of the Lake University	San Antonio, Texas	Inactive	
Iota Rho	1945 – April 1, 1990	Coe College	Cedar Rapids, Iowa	Inactive	
Iota Sigma	1945 – June 1, 1970	Towson State College	Baltimore, Maryland	Inactive	
Iota Tau (First) (see Omega Iota Tau)	1945 – May 1, 1946	Huron University	Huron, South Dakota	Reestablished	
**Iota Tau (Second)**	19xx ?	Longwood University	Farmville, Virginia	Active	
**Iota Upsilon**	1945	Belhaven University	Jackson, Mississippi	Active	
Iota Phi	1945 – February 1, 1969	American University	Washington, D.C.	Inactive	
Iota Chi	1945 – July 1, 1990	Columbia College	Columbia, South Carolina	Inactive	
Iota Psi	1945 – November 1, 2000	Manchester College	North Manchester, Indiana	Inactive	
Iota Omega	1945 – April 1, 2008	Davis & Elkins College	Elkins, West Virginia	Inactive	
**Kappa Alpha**	1946	Berry College	Mount Berry, Georgia	Active	
Kappa Beta (First)	19xx ? – May 1, 1954	Quincy College	Quincy, Illinois	Inactive	
Kappa Beta (Second)	1946 – May 1, 2013	Gannon University	Erie, Pennsylvania	Inactive	
Kappa Gamma	1946 – May 1, 1994	Southwest Missouri State University	Springfield, Missouri	Inactive	
Kappa Delta	1946 – September 1, 1987	Bethel College	McKenzie, Tennessee	Inactive	
Kappa Epsilon	1946 – July 1, 1987	Briar Cliff College	Sioux City, Iowa	Inactive	
Kappa Zeta	1946 – November 1, 1969	Cleveland State University	Cleveland, Ohio	Inactive	(Note: Chapter formed at Fenn College, a private school that was purchased and became the public Cleveland State University in 1965.)
**Kappa Eta**	1946	Ferris State University	Big Rapids, Michigan	Active	
**Kappa Theta**	1946	Central Michigan University	Mount Pleasant, Michigan	Active	
Kappa Iota	1946 – June 1, 1970	Southwestern at Memphis	Memphis, Tennessee	Inactive	
Kappa Kappa	1947 – April 1, 1982	University of Portland	Portland, Oregon	Inactive	
Kappa Lambda (First)	1947 – xxxx ?	St. Andrews Presbyterian College	Laurinburg, North Carolina	Inactive	
Kappa Lambda (Second)	xxxx ? – April 1, 2021	State University of New York at New Paltz	New Paltz, New York	Inactive	
Kappa Mu	1947 – April 1, 2001	Western Oregon University	Monmouth, Oregon	Inactive	
Kappa Nu	1947 – December 1, 1995	West Virginia Institute of Technology Montgomery Campus	Montgomery, West Virginia	Inactive	
Kappa Xi	1947 – May 1, 2008	Frostburg State University	Frostburg, Maryland	Inactive	
Kappa Omicron	1947 – April 1, 2021	Belmont University	Nashville, Tennessee	Inactive	
Kappa Pi	1947 – May 1, 1971	Greensboro College	Greensboro, North Carolina	Inactive	
Kappa Rho	1947 – December 1, 2015	Georgetown College	Georgetown, Kentucky	Inactive	
Kappa Sigma	1947 – October 1, 2014	Northwest Missouri State University	Maryville, Missouri	Inactive	
**Kappa Tau**	1947	Idaho State University	Pocatello, Idaho	Active	
Kappa Upsilon	1947 – October 1, 2014	Eastern New Mexico University	Portales, New Mexico	Inactive	
Kappa Phi	1947 – April 1, 2021	Texas A&M University–Kingsville	Kingsville, Texas	Inactive	(Note: Chapter formed at the Texas College of Arts and Industries, now Texas A&M University–Kingsville.)
Kappa Chi	1947 – June 1, 1971	Lewis & Clark College	Portland, Oregon	Inactive	
Kappa Psi (First) (see Phi Alpha)	1947–xxxx ?	Clemson University	Clemson, South Carolina	Reestablished	
Kappa Psi (Second)	xxxx ? – January 1, 2010	William Penn College	Oskaloosa, Iowa	Inactive	
Kappa Omega	1948 – April 1, 2012	Wayland Baptist University	Plainview, Texas	Inactive	
Lambda Alpha	1948 – April 1, 2022	Blue Mountain College	Blue Mountain, Mississippi	Inactive	
**Lambda Beta**	1948 – April 1, 2023	Keene State College	Keene, New Hampshire	Active	
Lambda Gamma	1948 – April 1, 2022	Middle Tennessee State University	Murfreesboro, Tennessee	Inactive	
Lambda Delta	1948 – March 1, 1983	University of Charleston	Charleston, West Virginia	Inactive	(Note: Chapter formed at Morris Harvey College, now the University of Charleston.)
**Lambda Epsilon**	1948	East Tennessee State University	Johnson City, Tennessee	Active	
**Lambda Zeta**	1948	Appalachian State University	Boone, North Carolina	Active	
**Lambda Eta**	1948	Drew University	Madison, New Jersey	Active	
Lambda Theta	1948 – June 1, 1996	Anderson University	Anderson, Indiana	Inactive	
Lambda Iota	1948 – May 1, 2021	Midland University	Fremont, Nebraska	Inactive	
Lambda Kappa	1948 – January 1, 1971	Wagner College	Staten Island, New York	Inactive	
Lambda Lambda	1948 – May 1, 1992	Arkansas State University	Jonesboro, Arkansas	Inactive	
Lambda Mu (First)	1948 – October 1, 1968	Wartburg College	Waverly, Iowa	Inactive	
Lambda Mu (Second)	xxxx ? – December 1, 2014	Lees–McRae College	Banner Elk, North Carolina	Inactive	
**Lambda Nu**	1948	University of Southern Mississippi	Hattiesburg, Mississippi	Active	
Lambda Xi	1949 – May 1, 2021	Fort Hays State University	Hays, Kansas	Inactive	
Lambda Omicron	1949 – March 1, 2021	Elon University	Elon, North Carolina	Inactive	
**Lambda Pi**	1949	Villanova University	Villanova, Pennsylvania	Active	
Lambda Rho	1949 – October 1, 2016	University of Central Oklahoma	Edmond, Oklahoma	Inactive	
Lambda Sigma	1949 – October 1, 2022	South Dakota State University	Brookings, South Dakota	Inactive	
Lambda Tau	1949 – May 1, 1971	Emmanuel College	Boston, Massachusetts	Inactive	
Lambda Upsilon	1949 – February 1, 1997	Mansfield University of Pennsylvania	Mansfield, Pennsylvania	Inactive	
Lambda Phi (First)	1949 – January 1, 1987	Dickinson College	Carlisle, Pennsylvania	Inactive	
Lambda Phi (Second)	19xx ? – May 1, 1959	Wake Forest University	Winston-Salem, North Carolina	Inactive	
Lambda Chi	1949 – May 1, 1973	University of Nebraska Omaha	Omaha, Nebraska	Inactive	
Lambda Psi	1949 – June 1, 1970	Tusculum College	Tusculum, Tennessee	Inactive	
**Lambda Omega**	1949	State University of New York at Oneonta	Oneonta, New York	Active	
**Mu Alpha**	1949	Hillsdale College	Hillsdale, Michigan	Active	
**Mu Beta**	1949	Emory University	Atlanta, Georgia	Active	
Mu Gamma	1949 – xxxx ?	Northwestern Oklahoma State University	Alva, Oklahoma	Inactive	
Mu Delta	1950 – April 1, 1977	New Mexico State University	Las Cruces, New Mexico	Inactive	(Note: Chapter was established at the New Mexico College of Agriculture and Mechanic Arts, now called New Mexico State University.)
Mu Epsilon	1950 – June 1, 1972	Adams State College	Alamosa, Colorado	Inactive	
Mu Epsilon (Second) (see Omega Chi)	1951 – xxxx ?	Lycoming College	Williamsport, Pennsylvania	Reestablished	
Mu Zeta (First)	1950 – February 1, 1969	American University in Cairo	Cairo, Egypt	Inactive	
Mu Zeta (Second)	xxxx ? – December 1, 2020	Austin Peay State University	Clarksville, Tennessee	Inactive	
**Mu Eta**	1950 – April 1, 2014; 20xx ?	Texas A&M University–Commerce	Commerce, Texas	Active	(Note: Chapter was established at the East Texas State Teachers College, now called Texas A&M University–Commerce.)
Mu Theta	June 1, 2001	John Carroll University	University Heights, Ohio	Inactive	
**Mu Iota**	1950	State University of New York at Oswego	Oswego, New York	Active	
Mu Kappa	1950 – May 1, 1967	California State University, Sacramento	Sacramento, California	Inactive	
**Mu Lambda**	1950	Western Kentucky University	Bowling Green, Kentucky	Active	
Mu Mu	1950 – March 1, 1963	Beaver College	Glenside, Pennsylvania	Inactive	
Mu Nu	1950 – October 1, 1989	Nicholls State University	Thibodaux, Louisiana	Inactive	
Mu Xi	1950 – April 1, 1957	Boston University	Boston, Massachusetts	Inactive	
Mu Omicron	195x ? –January 1, 1973	Memphis State University	Memphis, Tennessee	Inactive	
**Mu Pi**	1951	Creighton University	Omaha, Nebraska	Active	
Mu Rho	1951 – June 1, 1972	Rhode Island College	Providence, Rhode Island	Inactive	
Mu Sigma (First)	1951 – May 1, 1962	Albright College	Reading, Pennsylvania	Inactive	
Mu Sigma (Second)	19xx ? – May 1, 1973	National College of Education	Evanston, Illinois	Inactive	
Mu Tau (First)	1951 – October 1, 1985	Central Washington University	Ellensburg, Washington	Inactive	
**Mu Tau (Second)**		Xavier University	Cincinnati, Ohio	Active	
**Mu Upsilon**	1951	Athens State College	Athens, Alabama	Active	
Mu Phi	1951 – April 1, 2016	Southern Arkansas University	Magnolia, Arkansas	Inactive	
**Mu Chi**	1951	Adelphi University	Garden City, New York	Active	
**Mu Psi**	1951	Hofstra University	Hempstead, New York	Active	
Mu Omega	1951 – September 1, 1977	Duquesne University	Pittsburgh, Pennsylvania	Inactive	
Nu Alpha	1951 – June 1, 1994	University of West Alabama	Livingston, Alabama	Inactive	
Nu Beta	1951 –	Parsons School of Design	New York City, New York	Inactive	
Nu Gamma	1952 – May 1, 2013	Westminster College	New Wilmington, Pennsylvania	Inactive	
Nu Delta	1952 – May 1, 2021	Saint Mary's University of Minnesota	Winona, Minnesota	Inactive	
Nu Epsilon	1952 – March 1, 1979	University of Evansville	Evansville, Indiana	Inactive	
Nu Zeta (First)	19xx ? – May 1, 1969	Jersey City State College	Jersey City, New Jersey	Inactive	
Nu Zeta (Second)	1952–xxxx ?	Trinity Washington University	Washington, D.C.	Inactive	
Nu Eta	1952 – July 1, 2000	Niagara University	Niagara University, New York	Inactive	
Nu Theta	1952 – June 1, 1966	Hamilton College	Clifton, New York	Inactive	
Nu Iota	1952 – August 1, 2012	Hartwick College	Oneonta, New York	Inactive	
**Nu Kappa**	1952	Austin College	Sherman, Texas	Active	
**Nu Lambda**	1952	Notre Dame of Maryland University	Baltimore, Maryland	Active	
Nu Mu	1953–xxxx ?	Marylhurst University	Marylhurst, Oregon	Inactive	(Note: The university closed in 2018.)
Nu Nu	1953 – November 1, 2018	University of Findlay	Findlay, Ohio	Inactive	
Nu Xi	1953 – July 1, 1974	St. Mary's Dominican College	New Orleans, Louisiana	Inactive	
**Nu Omicron**	1953	Indiana University of Pennsylvania	Indiana, Pennsylvania	Active	
Nu PI	1954 – December 1, 1981	North Georgia College	Dahlonega, Georgia	Inactive	
**Nu Rho**	1954	Emporia State University	Emporia, Kansas	Active	
Nu Sigma	1954 – July 1, 2004	Lake Forest College	Lake Forest, Illinois	Inactive	
Nu Tau (First) (see Eta Tau First)	1954 – April 1, 1978	Carroll College	Waukesha, Wisconsin	Inactive	
Nu Tau (Second)	19xx ? – February 1, 2002	University of Wisconsin–Platteville	Platteville, Wisconsin	Inactive	
**Nu Upsilon**	1954	University of Nebraska at Kearney	Kearney, Nebraska	Active	
**Nu Phi**	1954	Morgan State University	Baltimore, Maryland	Active	
Nu Chi	1954 – October 1, 1982	Northeastern University	Boston, Massachusetts	Inactive	
Nu Psi	1954 – September 1, 1984	Rutgers University–Newark	Newark, New Jersey	Inactive	
Nu Omega	1954 – May 1, 1973	College of Saint Teresa	Winona, Minnesota	Inactive	(Note: This college closed in 1989.)
Scarlet Masque (Alpha Rho Second)	1954 – April 1, 2004	Wabash College	Crawfordsville, Indiana	Inactive	
Xi Alpha				Inactive	
Xi Beta	19xx ? – April 1, 2001	Lewis–Clark State College	Lewiston, Idaho	Inactive	
**Xi Gamma**	19xx ?	State University of New York at Plattsburgh	Plattsburgh, New York	Active	
Xi Delta	19xx ? – September 1, 2007	Wingate University	Wingate, North Carolina	Inactive	
**Xi Epsilon**	19xx ?	McDaniel College	Westminster, Maryland	Active	
Xi Zeta				Inactive ?	
Xi Eta	19xx ? – February 1, 2012	Missouri Western State University	Platte City, Missouri	Inactive	
**Xi Theta**	19xx ?	University of Alabama in Huntsville	Huntsville, Alabama	Active	
Xi Iota	19xx ? – December 1, 2012	Lander University	Greenwood, South Carolina	Inactive	
Omicron Alpha				Inactive ?	
Omicron Beta	19xx ? – January 1, 2019	Coastal Carolina University	Conway, South Carolina	Inactive	
Omicron Gamma				Inactive ?	
**Omicron Delta**	19xx ?	Shenandoah University	Winchester, Virginia	Active	
**Omicron Epsilon**	19xx ?	Butler University	Indianapolis, Indiana	Active	
Omicron Zeta				Inactive ?	
**Omicron Eta**	19xx ?	Jacksonville State University	Jacksonville, Alabama	Active	
Omicron Theta (First)	xxxx ? – August 1, 2014	Oral Roberts University	Tulsa, Oklahoma	Inactive	
**Omicron Theta (Second)**	19xx ?	University of West Florida	Pensacola, Florida	Active	
Omicron Iota	19xx ? – April 1, 2006	Freed–Hardeman University	Henderson, Tennessee	Inactive	
Omicron Kappa	19xx ? – March 1, 2021	University of West Georgia	Carrollton, Georgia	Inactive	
Omicron Lambda	19xx ? – December 1, 1979	Philander Smith College	Little Rock, Arkansas	Inactive	
Omicron Mu				Inactive ?	
Omicron Nu				Inactive ?	
Omicron Xi	19xx ? – April 1, 1999	Bluefield College	Bluefield, Virginia	Inactive	
Omicron Omicron				Inactive ?	
Omicron Pi				Inactive ?	
Omicron Rho	19xx ? – March 1, 1979	LeMoyne–Owen College	Memphis, Tennessee	Inactive	
Omicron Sigma	19xx ? – January 1, 1996	Colorado Christian College	Denver, Colorado	Inactive	
Omicron Tau	19xx ? – April 1, 1987	Spalding University	Louisville, Kentucky	Inactive	
Omicron Upsilon	19xx ? – January 1, 2015	Bowie State University	Bowie, Maryland	Inactive	
**Omicron Phi**		University of Tennessee at Chattanooga	Chattanooga, Tennessee	Active	
Omicron Chi	19xx ? – May 1, 1980	Texas A&M University–Corpus Christi	Corpus Christi, Texas	Inactive	
Omicron Psi				Inactive ?	
Omicron Omega				Inactive ?	
**Pi Alpha**	1954 – March 1, 2018	Eastern Michigan University	Ypsilanti, Michigan	Active	
Kentucky Lambda	1955 – April 1, 2024	Kentucky Wesleyan College	Owensboro, Kentucky	Inactive	
Pi Beta (see Upsilon Rho)	1955 – May 1, 1970	Mount Mercy College	Cedar Rapids, Iowa	Reestablished	
**Pi Gamma**	1955	McNeese State University	Lake Charles, Louisiana	Inactive	
Pi Delta	1955 – May 1, 2021	Midwestern State University	Wichita Falls, Texas	Active	
Pi Epsilon	1955 – April 1, 2007	Gettysburg College	Gettysburg, Pennsylvania	Inactive	
Pi Zeta (First)	October 1, 1968 – xxxx ?	Washington College	Chestertown, Maryland	Inactive	
Pi Zeta (Second)	xxxx ? – April 1, 2009	St. Francis College	Brooklyn, New York	Inactive	
Pi Eta (First)	1955 – April 1, 1978	Southern Oregon State College	Ashland, Oregon	Inactive	
Pi Eta (Second)	xxxx? – December 1, 2015	Birmingham–Southern College	Birmingham, Alabama	Inactive	
Pi Theta (First)	1955 – May 1, 1965	Guilford College	Greensboro, North Carolina	Inactive	
Pi Theta (Second)	1955–xxxx ?	Newark College of Engineering	Newark, New Jersey	Inactive	
Pi Iota	195x ?	Southern Oregon College of Education	Ashland, Oregon	Inactive	
Pi Kappa	1955 – May 1, 1996	David Lipscomb College	Nashville, Tennessee	Inactive	
**Pi Lambda**	1955	Illinois College	Jacksonville, Illinois	Active	
Pi Mu (First) (see Omega Pi Mu)	1955 – December 1, 1960	City University of New York	Brooklyn, New York	Reestablished	
**Pi Mu (Second)**	xxxx ? – April 1, 2024	Whittier College	Whittier, California	Active	
Tennessee Eta	1955 – September 1, 1993	Milligan College	Milligan College, Tennessee	Inactive	
Pi Nu	1956 – June 1, 1967	Marygrove College	Detroit, Michigan	Inactive	
Pi Xi	1956 – December 1, 2003	Chadron State College	Chadron, Nebraska	Inactive	
Pi Omicron	June 1, 2013	Lamar University	Beaumont, Texas	Inactive	
Pi Pi	1957 – May 1, 2014	Converse University	Spartanburg, South Carolina	Inactive	
Pi Rho (First)	1957 – May 1, 1962	Friends University	Wichita, Kansas	Inactive	
Pi Rho (Second) (see Omega Pi Rho)	xxxx ? – June 1, 1972	Xavier University of Louisiana	New Orleans, Louisiana	Reestablished	
Pi Sigma	1957 – January 1, 1973	Mercy College of Detroit	Detroit, Michigan	Inactive	
Pi Tau	1957 – June 1, 1994	Shippensburg University of Pennsylvania	Shippensburg, Pennsylvania	Inactive	
**Pi Upsilon**	1957 – April 1, 2024	Tennessee Tech	Cookeville, Tennessee	Active	
Pi Phi	1957 – November 1, 1992	Springfield College	Springfield, Massachusetts	Inactive	
**Pi Chi**	1957	Mississippi College	Clinton, Mississippi	Active	
Pi Psi	1957 – February 1, 1981	Westfield State College	Westfield, Massachusetts	Inactive	
Pi Omega	1957 – July 1, 1990	Sterling College	Sterling, Kansas	Inactive	
Vermont Eta	1957 – March 1, 2024	Norwich University	Northfield, Vermont	Inactive	
Rho Alpha	1958 – May 1, 1993	Pfeiffer College	Misenheimer, North Carolina	Inactive	
Rho Beta	1958 – December 1, 1972	Boston State College	Boston, Massachusetts	Inactive	
Rho Gamma	1958 – December 1, 2012	University of Tennessee at Martin	Martin, Tennessee	Inactive	
Rho Delta	1958 – May 1, 1980	Black Hills State College	Spearfish, South Dakota	Inactive	
Rho Epsilon	1958 – July 1, 2015	Valdosta State University	Valdosta, Georgia	Inactive	
Rho Zeta (First) (see **Phi Tau**)	1958 – xxxx ?	Northern State University	Aberdeen, South Dakota	Reestablished	(Note: The chapter was established at Northern State Teachers College, now Northern State University.)
Rho Zeta (Second)	xxxx ? – June 1, 2014	Fairleigh Dickinson University	Madison, New Jersey	Inactive	
**Oklahoma Gamma** (see Gamma Zeta)	1960 – April 1, 2024	Oklahoma City University	Oklahoma City, Oklahoma	Active	
Tennessee Zeta	1960 – May 1, 2013	Tennessee Wesleyan University	Athens, Tennessee	Inactive	
Rho Eta	1960 – September 1, 2003	Lebanon Valley College	Annville, Pennsylvania	Inactive	
Rho Theta	1960 – September 1, 2020	William Paterson University	Wayne, New Jersey	Inactive	
Rho Iota	1961 – April 1, 1973	Eastern Washington College	Cheney, Washington	Inactive	
**Rho Kappa**	1962	Worcester Polytechnic Institute	Worcester, Massachusetts	Active	
Rho Lambda	1961 – April 1, 1986	Framingham State College	Framingham, Massachusetts	Inactive	
**Rho Mu**	1961	West Chester University	West Chester, Pennsylvania	Active	
**Rho Nu**	1962	Rowan University	Glassboro, New Jersey	Active	(Note: Chapter formed at Glassboro State College, now called Rowan University.)
Rho Xi	1962–xxxx ?	Loyola University Chicago	Chicago, Illinois	Inactive	
Rho Omicron	1962 – May 1, 1995	Sioux Falls College	Sioux Falls, South Dakota	Inactive	
Rho Pi	1962–c. 1971	Notre Dame College	Grymes Hill, Staten Island, New York	Inactive	(Note: College merged with St. John's University in 1971.)
**Rho Rho**	1962	Monmouth University	West Long Branch, New Jersey	Active	
Rho Sigma	1962 – May 1, 1998	Millersville University of Pennsylvania	Millersville, Pennsylvania	Inactive	
Rho Tau	1962 – May 1, 1979	Luther College	Decorah, Iowa	Inactive	
Rho Upsilon	1963 – April 1, 2011	Kutztown University of Pennsylvania	Kutztown, Pennsylvania	Inactive	
Rho Phi	1962 – April 1, 2013	Grand Canyon University	Phoenix, Arizona	Inactive	
Rho Chi	1963 – June 1, 2004	Saint Joseph's University	Philadelphia, Pennsylvania	Inactive	
Rho Chi	19xx ? – May 1, 1967	Saint Vincent College	Latrobe, Pennsylvania	Inactive	
Rho Psi	1963 – May 1, 2012	Erskine College	Due West, South Carolina	Inactive	
Rho Omega	1963 – April 1, 1995	Notre Dame College	Cleveland, Ohio	Inactive	
Sigma Alpha	1964 – June 1, 2009	Oklahoma Christian University	Oklahoma City, Oklahoma	Inactive	
Sigma Beta	1964 – June 1, 1964	Principia College	Elsah, Illinois	Inactive	
Sigma Gamma	1964 – February 1, 2017	University of North Texas	Denton, Texas	Inactive	
Sigma Delta	1964 – January 1, 1987	Viterbo College	La Crosse, Wisconsin	Inactive	
Sigma Epsilon	1964 – November 1, 1994	East Carolina University	Greenville, North Carolina	Inactive	
Sigma Zeta	1964 – April 1, 2018	Randolph–Macon College	Ashland, Virginia	Inactive	
Sigma Zeta	19xx ? – May 1, 1986	Trenton State College	Trenton, New Jersey	Inactive	
Sigma Eta	1964 – April 1, 1972	Merrimack College	North Andover, Massachusetts	Inactive	
Sigma Theta	1965 –	Xavier		Inactive	
Sigma Iota	1965 – May 1, 1987	Dana College	Blair, Nebraska	Inactive	
Sigma Kappa	1965–xxxx ?	California Western University	San Diego, California	Inactive	
Sigma Kappa	19xx ? – June 1, 1973	United States International University Western Campus	San Diego, California	Inactive	
Sigma Lambda	1966 – May 1, 2007	University of New Orleans	Louisiana	Inactive	
Sigma Mu	1966 – November 1, 2015	University of Texas Rio Grande Valley	Edinburg, Texas	Inactive	(Note: Chapter was formed at the University of Texas–Pan American, which was replaced by the newly formed university, the University of Texas Rio Grande Valley, in August 2015.)
Sigma Nu	1965 – December 1, 1972	College of Steubenville	Steubenville, Ohio	Inactive	
**Sigma Xi**	1966	University of Science and Arts of Oklahoma	Chickasha, Oklahoma	Active	
Sigma Omicron	1966 – May 1, 1971	Emerson College	Boston, Massachusetts	Inactive	
Sigma Pi	1967 – July 1, 2003	California State Polytechnic University, Pomona	Pomona, California	Inactive	(Note: Chapter formed at California Polytechnic School, Kellogg-Vorhees Unit, which became California State Polytechnic University, Pomona in 1972.)
Sigma Rho	1967 – May 1, 1985	California Lutheran College	Thousand Oaks, California	Inactive	
Sigma Sigma	1967––xxxx ?	San Francisco College for Women	San Francisco, California	Inactive	
Sigma Tau	1967 – May 1, 2014	University of the Cumberlands	Williamsburg, Kentucky	Inactive	
Sigma Upsilon	1967 – April 1, 2013	University of Guam	Agana, Guam	Inactive	
**Sigma Phi**	1967	Elizabethtown College	Elizabethtown, Pennsylvania	Active	
Sigma Chi	1967–xxxx ?	William Carey University	Hattiesburg, Mississippi	Inactive	
Sigma Psi	1967 – May 1, 1971	Wright State University	Dayton, Ohio	Inactive	
Sigma Omega	xxxx ? – August 1, 2014	Salisbury University	Salisbury, Maryland	Inactive	
Tau Alpha				Inactive ?	
Tau Beta	19xx ? – May 1, 1993	Aurora University	Aurora, Illinois	Inactive	
Tau Gamma	19xx ? – May 1, 2013	Auburn University	Auburn, Alabama	Inactive	
**Tau Delta**	19xx ?	Saint Francis University	Loretto, Pennsylvania	Active	
Tau Epsilon	19xx ? – March 1, 1986	Barat College	Lake Forest, Illinois	Inactive	
Tau Eta	19xx ? – July 1, 2017	Rider University	Lawrence Township, New Jersey	Inactive	
Tau Theta	19xx ? – May 1, 1965	Central State University	Wilberforce, Ohio	Inactive	
Tau Iota	19xx ? – July 1, 1976	Saint Joseph's College	Brooklyn, New York	Inactive	
**Tau Lambda**	19xx ?	Samford University	Birmingham, Alabama	Active	
Tau Mu				Inactive ?	
Tau Nu	19xx ? – July 1, 1975	Agnes Scott College	Decatur, Georgia	Inactive	
Tau Xi				Inactive ?	
Tau Omicron	19xx ? – May 1, 1997	St. Mary of the Plains College	Dodge City, Kansas	Inactive	(Note: The college closed in 1992.)
Tau Pi	19xx ? – May 1, 1969	Mobile College	Mobile, Alabama	Inactive	
Tau Rho	19xx ? – November 1, 1968	Howard University	Washington, D.C.	Inactive	
Tau Sigma	19xx ? – January 1, 1979	La Salle College	Philadelphia, Pennsylvania	Inactive	
Tau Tau	19xx ? – February 1, 1969	Pikeville College	Pikeville, Kentucky	Inactive	
Tau Upsilon	19xx ? – February 1, 1970	University of Maryland, Baltimore County	Baltimore, Maryland	Inactive	
Tau Phi				Inactive ?	
Tau Chi	19xx ? – August 1, 1925	Gwynedd-Mercy College	Lower Gwynedd Township, Pennsylvania	Inactive	
Tau Psi				Inactive ?	
Tau Omega				Inactive ?	
Upsilon Alpha				Inactive ?	
Upsilon Beta	19xx ? – February 1, 1976	Lincoln University	Jefferson City, Missouri	Inactive	
Upsilon Gamma	xxxx ? – May 1, 2010	Loyola University Maryland	Baltimore, Maryland	Inactive	
Upsilon Delta	19xx ? – March 1, 1969	Bryant College	Providence, Rhode Island	Inactive	
**Upsilon Zeta**	19xx ?	Truman State University	Kirksville, Missouri	Active	
Upsilon Eta	19xx ? – May 1, 2024	Huntington University	Huntington, Indiana	Inactive	
Upsilon Theta	19xx ? – June 1, 1978	University of Arkansas at Monticello	Monticello, Arkansas	Inactive	
Upsilon Iota	19xx ? – March 1, 1989	Johnson C. Smith University	Charlotte, North Carolina	Inactive	
Upsilon Kappa				Inactive ?	
Upsilon Lambda	19xx ? – September 1, 1969	Husson College	Bangor, Maine	Inactive	
Upsilon Mu	19xx ? – December 1, 1971	State University of New York at Albany	Albany, New York	Inactive	
Upsilon Nu				Inactive ?	
Upsilon Xi	19xx ? – January 1, 2021	High Point University	High Point, North Carolina	Inactive	
Upsilon Omicron	19xx ? – March 1, 2022	Missouri Southern State University	Joplin, Missouri	Inactive	
Upsilon Pi	19xx ? – February 1, 1977	Fort Valley State College	Fort Valley, Georgia	Inactive	
Upsilon Rho (see Pi Beta)		Mount Mercy College	Cedar Rapids, Iowa	Inactive	
Upsilon Sigma				Inactive ?	
**Upsilon Tau**	19xx ?	Ripon College	Ripon, Wisconsin	Active	
Upsilon Upsilon				Inactive ?	
Upsilon Phi				Inactive ?	
Upsilon Chi	19xx ? – June 1, 2014	St. John's University	Jamaica, Queens	Inactive	
Upsilon Psi				Inactive ?	
Upsilon Omega				Inactive ?	
Phi Alpha (see Kappa Psi First)	19xx ? – January 1, 1999	Clemson University	Clemson, South Carolina	Inactive	
**Phi Beta**	19xx ?	Grand Valley State University	Allendale, Michigan	Active	
Phi Gamma				Inactive ?	
Phi Delta	19xx ? – November 1, 1975	University of Idaho	Moscow, Idaho	Inactive	
**Phi Epsilon**	19xx ?	North Carolina A&T State University	Greensboro, North Carolina	Active	
Phi Zeta	19xx ? – July 1, 2012	Elizabeth City State University	Elizabeth City, North Carolina	Inactive	
Phi Eta	xxxx ? – March 1, 2017	Rockhurst College	Kansas City, Missouri	Inactive	
Phi Theta				Inactive ?	
Phi Iota	19xx ? – January 1, 2020	Jacksonville University	Jacksonville, Florida	Inactive	
Phi Kappa	19xx ? – January 1, 1995	Asbury College	Wilmore, Kentucky	Inactive	
Phi Lambda	19xx ? – February 1, 2017	Cameron University	Lawton, Oklahoma	Inactive	
**Phi Mu**	19xx ?	Hampton University	Hampton, Virginia	Active	
Phi Nu	19xx ? – April 1, 2014	Fayetteville State University	Fayetteville, North Carolina	Inactive	
Phi Xi				Inactive ?	
**Phi Omicron**	19xx ?	University of Southern Indiana	Evansville, Indiana	Active	
Phi Pi	xxxx ? – January 1, 2009	Shorter College	Rome, Georgia	Inactive	
Phi Rho				Inactive ?	
Phi Sigma	19xx ? – May 1, 1989	Carroll College	Helena, Montana	Inactive	
**Phi Tau** (see Rho Zeta First)	19xx ?	Northern State University	Aberdeen, South Dakota	Active	
Phi Upsilon	19xx ? – June 1, 2021	Gardner–Webb University	Boiling Springs, North Carolina	Inactive	
Phi Phi				Inactive ?	
Phi Chi	19xx ? – December 1, 2014	University of Maine at Farmington	Farmington, Maine	Inactive	
Phi Psi	19xx ? – June 1, 2012	Wesleyan College	Macon, Georgia	Inactive	
Phi Omega				Inactive ?	
Chi Alpha	19xx ? – June 1, 1979	Saint Anselm College	Manchester, New Hampshire	Inactive	
Chi Beta				Inactive ?	
Chi Gamma	19xx ? – April 1, 1998	Averett College	Danville, Virginia	Inactive	
Chi Delta	19xx ? – August 1, 2018	Albany State University	Albany, Georgia	Inactive	
Chi Epsilon				Inactive ?	
Chi Zeta	19xx ? – June 1, 1999	Knox College	Galesburg, Illinois	Inactive	
**Chi Eta**	19xx ? – May 1, 2024	Blackburn College	Carlinville, Illinois	Active	
Chi Theta				Inactive ?	
Chi Iota	19xx ? – February 1, 2017	Bentley University	Waltham, Massachusetts	Inactive	
**Chi Kappa**	19xx ?	Oglethorpe University	Brookhaven, Georgia	Active	
Chi Lambda	19xx ? – October 1, 2022	Jackson State University	Jackson, Mississippi	Inactive	
Chi Mu				Inactive ?	
**Chi Nu**	19xx ?	Palm Beach Atlantic University	West Palm Beach, Florida	Active	
Chi Xi	19xx ? – April 1, 2012	University of Central Florida	Orlando, Florida	Inactive	
Chi Omicron	xxxx ? – May 1, 2013	Siena Heights University	Adrian, Michigan	Inactive	
Chi Pi	19xx ? – June 1, 2012	Yeshiva University	New York City, New York	Inactive	
Chi Rho				Inactive ?	
Chi Sigma	19xx ? – March 1, 1999	University of Memphis at Lambuth	Jackson, Tennessee	Inactive	
Chi Tau	19xx ? – July 1, 1977	Regis College	Denver, Colorado	Inactive	
Chi Phi				Inactive ?	
**Chi Chi**	19xx ?	Alabama State University	Montgomery, Alabama	Active	
**Chi Psi**	19xx ?	Southwest Minnesota State University	Marshall, Minnesota	Active	
Chi Omega	19xx ? – April 1, 2016	University of South Alabama	Mobile, Alabama	Inactive	
Psi Alpha	19xx ? – December 1, 2014	Cheyney University of Pennsylvania	Cheyney, Pennsylvania	Inactive	
Psi Beta	19xx ? – April 1, 2009	University of Alabama at Birmingham	Birmingham, Alabama	Inactive	
Psi Gamma	xxxx ? – August 1, 2008	Olivet College	Olivet, Michigan	Inactive	
Psi Delta	19xx ? – May 1, 1984	Colby–Sawyer College	New London, New Hampshire	Inactive	
Psi Epsilon	19xx ? – September 1, 2009	University of Montevallo	Montevallo, Alabama	Inactive	
Psi Zeta	19xx ? – May 1, 1991	Southern University	Baton Rouge, Louisiana	Inactive	
**Psi Eta**	19xx ?	Evangel University	Springfield, Missouri	Active	
Psi Theta	19xx ? – December 1, 2014	Gallaudet University	Washington, D.C.	Inactive	
Psi Kappa	19xx ? – February 1, 2017	North Carolina State University	Raleigh, North Carolina	Inactive	
Psi Lambda	19xx ? – April 1, 2006	University of Texas at Arlington	Arlington, Texas	Inactive	
Psi Mu				Inactive ?	
Psi Nu	19xx ? – February 1, 2021	Missouri University of Science and Technology	Rolla, Missouri	Inactive	
Psi Xi				Inactive ?	
Psi Omicron	19xx ? – March 1, 1975	Utica College	Utica, New York	Inactive	
Psi Pi	19xx ? – May 1, 1998	Marian College	Indianapolis, Indiana	Inactive	
Psi Rho	19xx ? – May 1, 1975	School of the Ozarks	Point Lookout, Missouri	Inactive	
Psi Sigma	19xx ? – October 1, 2012	Francis Marion University	Florence, South Carolina	Inactive	
Psi Tau				Inactive ?	
Psi Upsilon				Inactive ?	
Psi Phi	19xx ? – January 1, 2010	South Carolina State College	Orangeburg, South Carolina	Inactive	
Psi Chi				Inactive ?	
Psi Psi				Inactive ?	
Psi Omega	19xx ? – May 1, 1979	Houston Baptist University	Houston, Texas	Inactive	
Omega Alpha	19xx ? – May 1, 2006	Dakota Wesleyan University	Mitchell, South Dakota	Inactive	
**Omega Beta**	19xx ?	Grand View University	Des Moines, Iowa	Active	
Omega Gamma	19xx ? – May 1, 1999	University of Nevada, Las Vegas	Las Vegas, Nevada	Inactive	
Omega Delta				Inactive ?	
Omega Epsilon				Inactive ?	
Omega Zeta	19xx ? – July 1, 1990	Avila College	Kansas City, Missouri	Inactive	
Omega Eta	19xx ? – December 1, 1997	Indiana University Northwest	Gary, Indiana	Inactive	
Omega Theta	19xx ? – June 1, 1997	Nazareth College of Rochester	Pittsford, New York	Inactive	
Omega Iota	19xx ? – January 1, 1985; 19xx? – November 1, 1997	Faulkner University	Montgomery, Alabama	Inactive	(Note: Chapter formed at the Alabama Christian College, which became Faulkner University in 1985.)
**Omega Kappa**	19xx ?	Drury University	Springfield, Missouri	Active	
Omega Lambda	19xx ? – May 1, 2016	Concordia University Nebraska	Seward, Nebraska	Inactive	
Omega Mu	xxxx ? – January 1, 2014	St. Lawrence University	Canton, New York	Inactive	
Omega Nu	19xx ? – November 1, 1989	University of Wisconsin–Parkside	Kenosha, Wisconsin	Inactive	
Omega Xi	19xx ? – December 1, 2013	Millikin University	Decatur, Illinois	Inactive	
Omega Omicron	19xx ? – February 1, 1990	University of Arkansas	Fayetteville, Arkansas	Inactive	
Omega Pi (First)	19xx ? – September 1, 2019	Tarleton State University	Stephenville, Texas	Inactive	
**Omega Pi (Second)**	19xx ?	East Texas Baptist University	Marshall, Texas	Active	
Omega Rho	19xx ? – January 1, 2021	Miami University	Oxford, Ohio	Inactive	
Omega Sigma	19xx ? – May 1, 1997	Pepperdine University	Malibu, California	Inactive	
Omega Tau				Inactive ?	
Omega Upsilon				Inactive ?	
Omega Phi	xxxx ? – December 1, 2022	Louisiana Tech University	Ruston, Louisiana	Inactive	
Omega Chi (see Mu Epsilon Second)	xxxx ? – June 1, 2014	Lycoming College	Williamsport, Pennsylvania	Inactive	
Omega Psi				Inactive ?	
Omega Omega				Inactive ?	
Alpha Alpha Alpha	19xx ? – July 1, 2019	Mount St. Mary's University	Emmitsburg, Maryland	Inactive	
**Alpha Alpha Beta**	19xx ?	University of St. Thomas	Houston, Texas	Active	
Alpha Alpha Gamma	19xx ? – July 1, 1993	Cornell College	Mount Vernon, Iowa	Inactive	
Alpha Alpha Delta	19xx ? – May 1, 1997	Molloy College	Rockville Centre, New York	Inactive	
Alpha Alpha Epsilon	19xx ? – May 1, 2014	Howard Payne University	Brownwood, Texas	Inactive	
Alpha Alpha Zeta	xxxx ? – January 1, 2011	Eastern Illinois University	Charleston, Illinois	Inactive	
Alpha Alpha Eta	19xx ? – December 1, 2013	St. Edward's University	Austin, Texas	Inactive	
Alpha Alpha Theta				Inactive ?	
Alpha Alpha Iota	19xx ? – March 1, 1998	Point Loma Nazarene College	San Diego, California	Inactive	
Alpha Alpha Kappa				Inactive ?	
**Alpha Alpha Lambda**	19xx ?	Florida International University	Miami, Florida	Active	
Alpha Alpha Mu				Inactive ?	
Alpha Alpha Nu	19xx ? – May 1, 2016	State University of New York at Potsdam	Potsdam, New York	Inactive	
Alpha Alpha Xi				Inactive ?	
Alpha Alpha Omicron				Inactive ?	
Alpha Alpha Pi				Inactive ?	
Alpha Alpha Rho				Inactive ?	
Alpha Alpha Sigma	19xx ? – July 1, 1999	Wichita State University	Wichita, Kansas	Inactive	
Alpha Alpha Tau				Inactive ?	
Alpha Alpha Upsilon				Inactive ?	
Alpha Alpha Phi				Inactive ?	
**Alpha Alpha Chi**	19xx ?	Loyola University New Orleans	New Orleans, Louisiana	Active	
Alpha Alpha Psi				Inactive ?	
Alpha Alpha Omega	19xx ? – May 1, 2022	Maryville College	Maryville, Tennessee	Inactive	
Alpha Beta Alpha	19xx ? – October 1, 2000	Wheelock College	Boston, Massachusetts	Inactive	
**Alpha Beta Beta**	19xx ?	Alabama A&M University	Normal, Alabama	Active	
Alpha Beta Gamma	19xx ? – April 1, 2021	Piedmont University	Demorest, Georgia	Inactive	
Alpha Beta Delta	19xx ? – May 1, 2013	Queens University of Charlotte	Charlotte, North Carolina	Inactive	
**Alpha Beta Epsilon**	19xx ?	Hollins University	Hollins, Virginia	Active	
Alpha Beta Zeta	1993– September 1, 1999	Montreat College	Montreat, North Carolina	Inactive	
Alpha Beta Eta				Inactive ?	
Alpha Beta Theta	19xx ?	Mesa State College	Grand Junction, Colorado	Inactive	
**Alpha Beta Kappa**	19xx ?	Brenau University	Gainesville, Georgia	Active	
Alpha Beta Lambda				Inactive ?	
Alpha Beta Mu				Inactive ?	
Alpha Beta Nu	19xx ? – June 1, 1995	Mid Michigan Community College	Harrison, Michigan	Inactive	
Alpha Beta Xi	19xx ? – October 1, 2016	Lee University	Chattanooga, Tennessee	Inactive	
**Alpha Beta Omicron**	19xx ? – October 1, 2002	Massachusetts College of Liberal Arts	North Adams, Massachusetts	Active	
Alpha Beta Pi	19xx ? – August 1, 2010	Lake Erie College	Painesville, Ohio	Inactive	
Alpha Beta Rho	19xx ? – April 1, 1998	Indiana Wesleyan University	Marion, Indiana	Inactive	
**Alpha Beta Sigma (Renaissance Cast)**	19xx ?	Dillard University	New Orleans, Louisiana	Active	
Alpha Beta Tau				Inactive ?	
Alpha Beta Upsilon				Inactive ?	
Alpha Beta Phi				Inactive ?	
Alpha Beta Chi	19xx ? – December 1, 2003	Cumberland University	Lebanon, Tennessee	Inactive	
Alpha Beta Psi	19xx ? – May 1, 2002	University of Louisville	Louisville, Kentucky	Inactive	
**Alpha Beta Omega**	19xx ? – April 1, 2023	Purdue University	West Lafayette, Indiana	Active	
Alpha Gamma Alpha				Inactive ?	
Alpha Gamma Beta	19xx ? – February 1, 2017	Metropolitan State University of Denver	Denver, Colorado	Inactive	
**Alpha Gamma Gamma**	19xx ?	Kean University	Union Township, New Jersey	Active	
Alpha Gamma Delta				Inactive ?	
Alpha Gamma Epsilon	19xx ? – June 1, 1999	Barry University	Miami Shores, Florida	Inactive	
Alpha Gamma Zeta	19xx ? – March 1, 2003	Gonzaga University	Spokane, Washington	Inactive	
**Alpha Gamma Eta**	19xx ?	Saginaw Valley State University	University Center, Michigan	Active	
**Alpha Gamma Theta**	19xx ?	James Madison University	Harrisonburg, Virginia	Active	
Alpha Gamma Kappa	19xx ? – May 1, 2021	Winona State University	Winona, Minnesota	Inactive	
Alpha Gamma Lambda	19xx ? – January 1, 1999	University of California, Davis	Davis, California	Inactive	
Alpha Gamma Mu	19xx ? – June 1, 2021	Savannah College of Art and Design	Savannah, Georgia	Inactive	
Alpha Gamma Nu				Inactive ?	
Alpha Gamma Xi				Inactive ?	
Alpha Gamma Omicron	19xx ? – June 1, 2008	Kennesaw State University	Kennesaw, Georgia	Inactive	
Alpha Gamma Pi				Inactive ?	
Alpha Gamma Rho				Inactive ?	
Alpha Gamma Sigma	19xx ? – August 1, 2018	The College of New Jersey	Ewing Township, New Jersey	Inactive	
Alpha Gamma Tau (see Beta Theta First)	19xx ? – April 1, 2008	University of Georgia	Athens, Georgia	Inactive	
Alpha Gamma Upsilon	19xx ?	Eastern Connecticut State University	Willimantic, Connecticut	Inactive	
Alpha Gamma Upsilon	19xx ? – December 1, 1999	Central Connecticut State University	New Britain, Connecticut	Inactive	
Alpha Gamma Phi	19xx ? – June 1, 2002	Northeastern Illinois University	Chicago, Illinois	Inactive	
**Alpha Gamma Psi**	19xx ?	Santa Clara University	Santa Clara, California	Active	
Alpha Gamma Omega	19xx ? – November 1, 2018	Clark Atlanta University	Atlanta, Georgia	Inactive	
**Alpha Delta Alpha**	19xx ? – May 1, 2013; before 2018	North Carolina Wesleyan University	Rocky Mount, North Carolina	Active	
**Alpha Delta Beta**	2001	Sweet Briar College	Sweet Briar, Virginia	Active	
Alpha Delta Gamma	19xx ? – May 1, 2016	Florida State University	Tallahassee, Florida	Inactive	
**Alpha Delta Delta**	19xx ?	Messiah University	Grantham, Pennsylvania	Active	
Alpha Delta Epsilon	19xx ? – August 1, 2011	Bennett College	Greensboro, North Carolina	Inactive	
**Alpha Delta Zeta**	19xx ?	Christopher Newport University	Newport News, Virginia	Active	
Alpha Delta Eta	19xx ? – October 1, 2009	St. Catherine University	Saint Paul, Minnesota	Inactive	
Alpha Delta Theta	19xx ? – October 1, 2011	Richard Stockton College of New Jersey	Pomona, New Jersey	Inactive	
Alpha Delta Iota				Inactive ?	
Alpha Delta Kappa	19xx ? – January 1, 2012	Florida Gulf Coast University	Fort Myers, Florida	Inactive	
Alpha Delta Lambda				Inactive ?	
Alpha Delta Mu	19xx ? – May 1, 2014	St. Bonaventure University	St. Bonaventure, New York	Inactive	
Alpha Delta Nu	19xx ? – April 1, 2021	College of William & Mary	Williamsburg, Virginia	Inactive	
Alpha Delta Xi	19xx ? – June 1, 2014	Stevenson University	Stevenson, Maryland	Inactive	
Alpha Delta Omicron	19xx ? – May 1, 2004	University of Colorado Colorado Springs	Colorado Springs, Colorado	Inactive	
Alpha Delta Pi				Inactive ?	
Alpha Delta Rho	19xx ? – April 1, 2004	Minnesota State University Moorhead	Moorhead, Minnesota	Inactive	
Alpha Delta Sigma	19xx ? – August 1, 2010	Hamline University	Saint Paul, Minnesota	Inactive	
Alpha Delta Tau	19xx ? – June 1, 2003	Loyola Marymount University	Los Angeles, California	Inactive	
Alpha Delta Upsilon	19xx ?	Sonoma State University	Rohnert Park, California	Inactive	
Alpha Delta Phi				Inactive ?	
Alpha Delta Chi				Inactive ?	
Alpha Delta Psi				Inactive ?	
**Alpha Delta Omega**	19xx ?	Flagler College	St. Augustine, Florida	Active	
Alpha Epsilon Alpha	19xx ? – October 1, 2016	Ramapo College	Mahwah, New Jersey	Inactive	
Alpha Epsilon Beta	19xx ? – April 1, 2022	Florida Atlantic University	Boca Raton, Florida	Inactive	
Alpha Epsilon Gamma	19xx ?	University of San Francisco	San Francisco, California	Inactive	
Alpha Epsilon Delta	19xx ?	California State University, Stanislaus	Turlock, California	Inactive	
Alpha Epsilon Epsilon (Duzer Du)	19xx ? – June 1, 2021	DePauw University	Greencastle, Indiana	Inactive	
Alpha Epsilon Zeta	19xx ?	College of the Southwest	Hobbs, New Mexico	Inactive	
Alpha Epsilon Eta	19xx ? – June 1, 2014	Transylvania University	Lexington, Kentucky	Inactive	
**Alpha Epsilon Theta**	19xx ?	Pittsburg State University	Pittsburg, Kansas	Active	
Alpha Epsilon Iota	19xx ? – April 1, 2016	Marist College	Poughkeepsie, New York	Inactive	
Alpha Epsilon Kappa	19xx ? – January 1, 2014	George Fox University	Newberg, Oregon	Inactive	
Alpha Epsilon Lambda	19xx ? – October 1, 2011	Ohio State University	Columbus, Ohio	Inactive	
Alpha Epsilon Mu	19xx ? – June 1, 2006	Quinnipiac University	Hamden, Connecticut	Inactive	
Alpha Epsilon Nu	19xx ? – January 1, 2015	Columbus State University	Columbus, Georgia	Inactive	
Alpha Epsilon Xi	19xx ? – June 1, 2006	Southern Virginia University	Buena Vista, Virginia	Inactive	
**Alpha Epsilon Omicron**	19xx ?	Anderson University	Anderson, South Carolina	Active	
**Alpha Epsilon Pi**	19xx ?	Saint Louis University	St. Louis, Missouri	Active	
Alpha Epsilon Rho	19xx ? – April 1, 2011	Coppin State University	Baltimore, Maryland	Inactive	
**Alpha Epsilon Sigma**	19xx ?	North Greenville University	East Lansing, Michigan	Active	
Alpha Epsilon Tau (see **Alpha Zeta Eta** **Second**)	19xx ? – December 1, 2007	Michigan State University	East Lansing, Michigan	Inactive	
Alpha Epsilon Upsilon	19xx ? – May 1, 2007	University of Massachusetts Amherst	Amherst, Massachusetts	Inactive	
**Alpha Epsilon Phi**	19xx ? – May 1, 2022	Monmouth College	Monmouth, Illinois	Active	
Alpha Epsilon Chi	19xx ? – June 1, 2008	Roger Williams University	Bristol, Rhode Island	Inactive	
**Alpha Epsilon Psi**	19xx ?	Southeastern Louisiana University	Hammond, Louisiana	Active	
Alpha Epsilon Omega	19xx ? – January 1, 2010	Waldorf College	Forest City, Iowa	Inactive	
Alpha Zeta Alpha	19xx ? – October 1, 2007	North Dakota State University	Fargo, North Dakota	Inactive	
**Alpha Zeta Beta**	19xx ?	Texas Woman's University	Denton, Texas	Active	
Alpha Zeta Gamma	19xx ? – May 1, 2013	Robert Morris University	Moon Township, Pennsylvania	Inactive	
Alpha Zeta Delta	19xx ? – March 1, 2015	University of Missouri	Columbia, Missouri	Inactive	
Alpha Zeta Epsilon (First)	19xx ? – November 1, 2014	University of Kentucky	Lexington, Kentucky	Inactive	
Alpha Zeta Epsilon (Second)	xxxx ? – May 1, 2021	University of Nevada, Reno	Reno, Nevada	Inactive	
Alpha Zeta Zeta	19xx ? – May 1, 2008	University of Michigan–Flint	Flint, Michigan	Inactive	
Alpha Zeta Eta (First)	19xx ? – May 1, 2008	Christian Brothers University	Memphis, Tennessee	Inactive	
**Alpha Zeta Eta (Second)** (see Alpha Epsilon Tau)	before 2018	Michigan State University	East Lansing, Michigan	Active	
Alpha Zeta Theta	19xx ? – June 1, 2012	University of Louisiana at Lafayette	Lafayette, Louisiana	Inactive	
Alpha Zeta Iota	19xx ? – July 1, 2008	Penn State Berks	Reading, Pennsylvania	Inactive	
Alpha Zeta Kappa	19xx ? – September 1, 2008	University of the Arts	Philadelphia, Pennsylvania	Inactive	
**Alpha Zeta Lambda**	19xx ?	Seton Hill University	Greensburg, Pennsylvania	Active	
Alpha Zeta Mu	19xx ? – June 1, 2021	St. Olaf College	Northfield, Minnesota	Inactive	
Alpha Zeta Nu	19xx ? – August 1, 2009	Portland State University	Portland, Oregon	Inactive	
**Alpha Zeta Xi**	19xx ?	Ferrum College	Ferrum, Virginia	Active	
**Alpha Zeta Omicron**		University of Maine	Orono, Maine	Active	
Alpha Zeta Pi	19xx ? – March 1, 2022	Lincoln College	Lincoln, Illinois	Inactive	
Alpha Zeta Rho	19xx ? – June 1, 2012	Saint Augustine's University	Raleigh, North Carolina	Inactive	
Alpha Zeta Sigma	19xx ? – June 1, 2014	State University of New York at Brockport	Brockport, New York	Inactive	
**Alpha Zeta Tau**	19xx ?	Young Harris College	Young Harris, Georgia	Active	
**Alpha Zeta Upsilon**	19xx ?	George Mason University	Fairfax, Virginia	Active	
Alpha Zeta Phi	19xx ? – April 1, 2017	Cabrini College	Radnor Township, Pennsylvania	Inactive	
Alpha Zeta Chi	19xx ? – September 1, 2014	University of Northern Iowa	Cedar Falls, Iowa	Inactive	
Alpha Zeta Psi	19xx ? – April 1, 2014	Marywood University	Scranton, Pennsylvania	Inactive	
**Alpha Zeta Omega**	19xx ?	Schreiner University	Kerrville, Texas	Active	
Alpha Eta Alpha	19xx ? – December 1, 2013	Southeastern University	Lakeland, Florida	Inactive	
**Alpha Eta Beta**	19xx ? – May 1, 2024	Virginia Wesleyan University	Virginia Beach, Virginia	Active	
**Alpha Eta Gamma**	19xx ?	Lindsey Wilson College	Columbia, Kentucky	Active	
Alpha Eta Delta (see Alpha Psi)	19xx ? – March 1, 2015	Temple University	Philadelphia, Pennsylvania	Inactive	
Alpha Eta Epsilon	19xx ? – March 1, 2015	Lourdes University	Sylvania, Ohio	Inactive	
Alpha Eta Zeta	19xx ? – April 1, 2012	Penn State Altoona	Logan Township, Blair County, Pennsylvania	Inactive	
Alpha Eta Eta	19xx ? – June 1, 2015	Shawnee State University	Portsmouth, Ohio	Inactive	
Alpha Eta Theta	19xx ? – February 1, 2022	Oklahoma State University–Stillwater	Stillwater, Oklahoma	Inactive	
Alpha Eta Iota	19xx ? – August 1, 2020	Delaware State University	Dover, Delaware	Inactive	
Alpha Eta Kappa	19xx ? – July 1, 2012	College of New Rochelle	New Rochelle, New York	Inactive	
**Alpha Eta Lambda**	19xx ?	College of Wooster	Wooster, Ohio	Active	
Alpha Eta Mu				Inactive ?	
**Alpha Eta Nu** (see Beta Beta Second)		Lafayette College	Easton, Pennsylvania	Active	
**Alpha Eta Xi**	19xx ?	Northern Michigan University	Marquette, Michigan	Active	
Alpha Eta Omicron	19xx ? – June 1, 2016	Bucknell University	Lewisburg, Pennsylvania	Inactive	
**Alpha Eta Pi**	19xx ?	Campbellsville University	Campbellsville, Kentucky	Active	
Alpha Eta Rho	19xx ? – May 1, 2014	Bethune–Cookman University	Daytona Beach, Florida	Inactive	
Alpha Eta Sigma	19xx ? – December 1, 2015	Northern Kentucky University	Highland Heights, Kentucky	Inactive	
**Alpha Eta Tau**	19xx ?	Indiana State University	Terre Haute, Indiana	Active	
**Alpha Eta Upsilon**	19xx ?	Bowling Green State University	Bowling Green, Ohio	Active	
**Alpha Eta Phi**	19xx ? – March 1, 2015; May 2026 —	Hanover College	Hanover, Indiana	Active	
Alpha Eta Chi	19xx ? – May 1, 1980	Paine College	Augusta, Georgia	Inactive	
Alpha Eta Psi	19xx ? – May 1, 2015	Miles College	Fairfield, Alabama	Inactive	
Alpha Eta Omega	19xx ? – December 1, 2016	University of San Diego	San Diego, California	Inactive	
**Alpha Theta Alpha**	19xx ? – April 1, 2023	Winston-Salem State University	Winston-Salem, North Carolina	Active	
**Alpha Theta Beta**	19xx ? – June 1, 2024	Bellarmine University	Louisville, Kentucky	Active	
Alpha Theta Gamma				Inactive ?	
Alpha Theta Delta	19xx ? – February 1, 2016	Illinois Institute of Technology	Chicago, Illinois	Inactive	
**Alpha Theta Epsilon**	19xx ?	Rollins College	Winter Park, Florida	Active	
Alpha Theta Zeta	19xx ? – April 1, 2016	Southeast Missouri State University	Cape Girardeau, Missouri	Inactive	
Alpha Theta Eta	19xx ? – May 1, 2016	Michigan Technological University	Houghton, Michigan	Inactive	
Alpha Theta Theta (see Beta Zeta)	19xx ? – April 1, 2016	State University of New York at Buffalo	Buffalo, New York	Inactive	
Alpha Theta Iota	19xx ? – April 1, 2016	Syracuse University	Syracuse, New York	Inactive	
Alpha Theta Kappa	19xx ? – November 1, 2019	Norfolk State University	Norfolk, Virginia	Inactive	
Alpha Theta Lambda	19xx ? – October 1, 2022	University of Tulsa	Tulsa, Oklahoma	Inactive	
Alpha Theta Mu	19xx ? – October 1, 2016	American University of Kuwait	Salmiya, Kuwait	Inactive	
Alpha Theta Nu (see Alpha Epsilon First)	19xx ? – March 1, 2018	Westminster College	Fulton, Missouri	Inactive	
Alpha Theta Xi	19xx ? – June 1, 2021	Biola University	La Mirada, California	Inactive	
Alpha Theta Omicron	19xx ? – May 1, 2017	Georgia Southern University–Armstrong Campus	Savannah, Georgia	Inactive	
Alpha Theta Pi	19xx ? – November 1, 2017	Le Moyne College	DeWitt, New York	Inactive	
Alpha Theta Rho	19xx ? – November 1, 2017	Texas A&M International University	Laredo, Texas	Inactive	
Alpha Theta Sigma	19xx ? – November 1, 2017	Illinois Wesleyan University	Bloomington, Illinois	Inactive	
**Alpha Theta Tau**		University of North Carolina at Chapel Hill	Chapel Hill, North Carolina	Active	
Alpha Theta Upsilon	19xx ? – March 1, 2022	York College of Pennsylvania	Spring Garden Township, Pennsylvania	Inactive	
Alpha Theta Phi	19xx ? – February 1, 2019	Keystone College	La Plume Township, Pennsylvania	Inactive	
Alpha Theta Chi				Inactive ?	
**Alpha Theta Psi**		Grove City College	Grove City, Pennsylvania	Active	
**Alpha Theta Omega**		Mitchell College	New London, Connecticut	Active	
**Alpha Iota Alpha**		Tennessee State University	Nashville, Tennessee	Active	
Alpha Iota Beta (see Gamma Upsilon)	xxxx ? – January 1, 2022	Northern Illinois University	DeKalb, Illinois	Inactive	
Alpha Iota Gamma	xxxx ? – April 1, 2021	Regent University	Virginia Beach, Virginia	Inactive	
Alpha Iota Delta	xxxx ? – December 1, 2020	Albion College	Albion, Michigan	Inactive	
Alpha Iota Epsilon	xxxx ? – April 1, 2021	Aquinas College	Grand Rapids, Michigan	Inactive	
Alpha Iota Zeta	xxxx ? – July 1, 2021	Alice Lloyd College	Pippa Passes, Kentucky	Inactive	
**Alpha Iota Eta**		University of Arkansas–Fort Smith	Fort Smith, Arkansas	Active	
Alpha Iota Theta		Whitman College	Walla Walla, Washington	Inactive	
Alpha Iota Iota		University of Kansas	Lawrence, Kansas	Inactive	
Alpha Iota Kappa		Azusa Pacific University	Azusa, California	Inactive	
**Alpha Iota Lambda**		University of Wisconsin–Whitewater	Whitewater, Wisconsin	Active	
**Alpha Iota Mu**		University of California, Santa Barbara	Santa Barbara, California	Active	
**Alpha Iota Nu**		Denison University	Granville, Ohio	Active	
Alpha Iota Xi				Inactive ?	
**Alpha Iota Omicron**		Grambling State University	Grambling, Louisiana	Active	
**Alpha Iota Pi**		Western Illinois University	Macomb, Illinois	Active	
**Alpha Iota Rho**		Eastern Connecticut State University	Willimantic, Connecticut	Active	
**Alpha Iota Sigma**		Fisk University	Nashville, Tennessee	Active	
**Alpha Kappa Alpha**		Union College	Schenectady, New York	Active	
**Alpha Kappa Lambda**	September 10, 2026	Ohio Wesleyan University	Delaware, Ohio	Active	
**Zeta Alpha Beta**		Muskingum University	New Concord, Ohio	Active	
Eta Gamma Rho	xxxx ? – July 1, 2011	Edison State College	Punta Gorda, Florida	Inactive	
**Eta Kappa Tau**		Howard College	Big Spring, Texas	Active	
**Kappa Theta Alpha**		Liberty University	Lynchburg, Virginia	Active	
**Mu Sigma Mu**		Manhattan School of Music	New York City, New York	Active	
Pi Rho Omega	19xx ? – July 1, 1973	Long Island University	Brooklyn, New York	Inactive	
Omega Alpha Alpha (see Alpha Alpha (First))	xxxx ? – January 1, 2022	Concordia College	Moorhead, Minnesota	Inactive	
Omega Alpha Nu	xxxx ? – August 1, 2002	Georgia Southwestern College	Americus, Georgia	Inactive	
Omega Alpha Upsilon	1928 – January 1, 2015	Clarion University	Clarion, Pennsylvania	Inactive	
Omega Alpha Phi (see Alpha Phi (First))		Taylor University	Upland, Indiana	Inactive	
Omega Beta Iota	19xx ? – December 1, 1963	Boise State University	Boise, Idaho	Inactive	(Note: Chapter was also called Idaho Beta.)
Omega Beta Lambda	19xx ? – September 1, 1976	Western Connecticut State College	Danbury, Connecticut	Inactive	
Omega Beta Mu (see Beta Mu First)		Gustavus Adolphus College	St. Peter, Minnesota	Inactive	
Omega Beta Rho (see Beta Rho)		Wayne State College	Wayne, Nebraska	Inactive	
Omega Delta Iota (see Delta Iota First)		Centenary College of Louisiana	Shreveport, Louisiana	Inactive	
Omega Delta Lambda (see Delta Lambda First)		Northwestern College	Orange City, Iowa	Inactive	
Omega Gamma Nu (see Gamma Nu (Second))	19xx ? – September 1, 2003	Georgia State University	Atlanta, Georgia	Inactive	
Omega Eta Alpha (see Eta First)		Fort Lewis College	Durango, Colorado	Inactive	
Omega Eta Epsilon (see Eta Epsilon Second)		Chaminade College	Honolulu, Hawaii	Inactive	
Omega Zeta Lambda (see Zeta Lambda)	19xx ? – September 1, 2008	Central Methodist University	Fayette, Missouri	Inactive	
Omega Zeta Nu (see Zeta Nu (First))	19xx ? – June 1, 2014	State University of New York at Geneseo	Geneseo, New York	Inactive	
Omega Zeta Psi	19xx ? – December 1, 1972	Temple Buell College	Denver, Colorado	Inactive	
Omega Eta Kappa (see Eta Kappa First)		Northern Montana College	Havre, Montana	Inactive	
Omega Eta Xi		Blue Ridge College	New Windsor, Maryland	Inactive	(Note: The college closed in 1943.)
Omega Eta Pi	19xx ? – July 1, 1970	University of Baltimore	Baltimore, Maryland	Inactive	
Omega Eta Omega (see Eta Second)	19xx ? – June 1, 2000	College of Idaho	Caldwell, Idaho	Inactive	(Note: Chapter also called Idaho Eta.)
Omega Iota Tau (see Iota Tau (First))		Huron University	Huron, South Dakota	Inactive	
Omega Kappa Epsilon	June 1, 2012	Bradley University	Peoria, Illinois	Inactive	(Note: Chapter was also called Kappa Epsilon (Second).)
Omega Nu Nu	19xx ? – May 1, 1952	Loretto Heights College	Denver, Colorado	Inactive	
Omega Pi Mu (see Pi Mu (First))		City University of New York	Brooklyn, New York	Inactive	
Omega Pi Rho (see Pi Rho (Second))		Xavier University of Louisiana	New Orleans, Louisiana	Inactive	
Omega Sigma Mu	xxxx ? – May 1, 2022	Centenary University	Hackettstown, New Jersey	Inactive	
Alfred State College	19xx ? – May 1, 1998	Alfred State College	Alfred, New York	Inactive	
Angelina College	19xx ? – May 1, 1999	Angelina College	Lufkin, Texas	Inactive	
Campbell University	19xx ? – August 1, 1997	Campbell University	Buies Creek, North Carolina	Inactive	
Capital University	xxxx ? – May 1, 2016	Capital University	Columbus, Ohio	Inactive	
Cardinal Stritch College	19xx ? – April 1, 2003	Cardinal Stritch University	Milwaukee, Wisconsin	Inactive	
Catawba College	xxxx ? – June 1, 2010	Catawba College	Salisbury, North Carolina	Inactive	
Cedarville University	xxxx ? – October 1, 2009	Cedarville University	Cedarville, Ohio	Inactive	
Colorado Zeta	19xx ? – November 1, 1993	University of Southern Colorado	Pueblo, Colorado	Inactive	
**Cottey College**		Cottey College	Nevada, Missouri	Active	
Dallas College Richland Campus	xxxx ? – March 1, 2014	Dallas College Richland	Dallas, Texas	Inactive	
Eastern University		Eastern University	St. Davids, Pennsylvania	Inactive	
**Florida State College at Jacksonville**		Florida State College at Jacksonville	Jacksonville, Florida	Active	
Harding University (Texas)	19xx ? – May 1, 1990	Harding University	Irving, Texas	Inactive	
Kansas State University		Kansas State University	Manhattan, Kansas	Inactive	
Lakeland College	19xx ? – February 1, 1980	Lakeland College	Sheboygan, Wisconsin	Inactive	
Lambuth College		Lambuth College	Jackson, Tennessee	Inactive	
Lawrence University		Lawrence University	Appleton, Wisconsin	Inactive	
Limestone College	xxxx ? – September 1, 2011	Limestone College	Gaffney, South Carolina	Inactive	
Loras Players	19xx ? – May 1, 2000	Loras College	Dubuque, Iowa	Inactive	
Malone College	xxxx ? – March 1, 2018	Malone College	Canton, Ohio	Inactive	
Marquette University	19xx ? – November 1, 1990	Marquette University	Milwaukee, Wisconsin	Inactive	
Mars Hill University	xxxx ? – May 1, 2016	Mars Hill University	Mars Hill, North Carolina	Inactive	
Mayville State College	19xx ? – July 1, 1978	Mayville State College	Mayville, North Dakota	Inactive	
Methodist College	19xx ? – May 1, 1999	Methodist College, North Carolina	Fayetteville, North Carolina	Inactive	
Midland College	19xx ? – December 1, 2002	Midland College	Midland, Texas	Inactive	
Mount Aloysius College	19xx ? – March 1, 1999	Mt. Aloysius College	Cresson, Pennsylvania	Inactive	(Note: Chapter formed as Delta Psi Omega at Mt. Aloysius Junior College, which became Mount Aloysius College in 1991. The chapter then became Alpha Psi Omega.)
Mount Marty University	19xx ? – June 1, 1976	Mount Marty College	Yankton, South Dakota	Inactive	
Mount Mary University	19xx ? – May 1, 1976	Mount Mary College	Milwaukee, Wisconsin	Inactive	
**North Carolina Central University**		North Carolina Central University	Durham, North Carolina	Active	
Northeastern State University	xxxx ? – November 1, 2014	Northeastern State University	Tahlequah, Oklahoma	Inactive	
Ohio Dominican College	19xx ? – May 1, 1979	Ohio Dominican College	Columbus, Ohio	Inactive	
Oklahoma Baptist University	xxxx ? – April 1, 2010	Oklahoma Baptist University	Shawnee, Oklahoma	Inactive	
OKWU Drama Society		Oklahoma Wesleyan University	Bartlesville, Oklahoma	Inactive	
Old Dominion University	xxxx ? – May 1, 2014	Old Dominion University	Norfolk, Virginia	Inactive	
Phillips University	19xx ? – May 1, 1974	Phillips University	Enid, Oklahoma	Inactive	
Point Park University	19xx ? – February 1, 1987	Point Park College	Pittsburgh, Pennsylvania	Inactive	
Prairie View College	19xx ? – March 1, 1987	Prairie View College	Prairie View, Texas	Inactive	
Presbyterian College	19xx ? – March 1, 2001	Presbyterian College	Clinton, South Carolina	Inactive	
St. Gregory's University	xxxx ? – January 1, 2013	St. Gregory's University	Shawnee, Oklahoma	Inactive	
St. Mary's University of San Antonio	19xx ? – April 1, 1985	St. Mary's University, Texas	San Antonio, Texas	Inactive	
St. Norbert College	19xx ? – February 1, 1985	St. Norbert College	De Pere, Wisconsin	Inactive	
Salem College	19xx ? – April 1, 1982	Salem College	Salem, West Virginia	Inactive	
Salem College	xxxx ? – December 1, 2014	Salem College	Winston-Salem, North Carolina	Inactive	
Seattle Pacific College	19xx ? – November 1, 1976	Seattle Pacific College	Seattle, Washington	Inactive	
**Shepherd University**	19xx ? – January 1, 1990; xxxx ?	Shepherd University	Shepherdstown, West Virginia	Active	
Southwestern University	19xx ? – May 1, 2000	Southwestern University	Georgetown, Texas	Inactive	
Texarkana College	19xx ? – January 1, 1982	Texarkana College	Texarkana, Texas	Inactive	
Texas Lutheran University	19xx ? – May 1, 2006	Texas Lutheran University	Seguin, Texas	Inactive	
Texas Southern University	19xx ? – May 1, 1997	Texas Southern University	Houston, Texas	Inactive	
University of Charleston	xxxx ? – July 26, 2004	University of Charleston	Charleston, West Virginia	Inactive	
University of Iowa	xxxx ?	University of Iowa	Iowa City, Iowa	Inactive	
**University of North Carolina**	19xx ?	University of North Carolina at Charlotte	Charlotte, North Carolina	Active	
University of North Carolina at Asheville	2009 – November 1, 2013	University of North Carolina at Asheville	Asheville, North Carolina	Inactive	
University of North Carolina at Greensboro	xxxx ? – April 1, 2009	University of North Carolina at Greensboro	Greensboro, North Carolina	Inactive	
University of North Carolina at Wilmington	xxxx ? – June 1, 2006	University of North Carolina Wilmington	Wilmington, North Carolina	Inactive	
University of North Dakota	19xx ? – June 1, 1990	University of North Dakota	Grand Forks, North Dakota	Inactive	
University of Oklahoma	xxxx ? – May 1, 2013	University of Oklahoma	Norman, Oklahoma	Inactive	
University of Pittsburgh	19xx ? – February 1, 1966	University of Pittsburgh	Pittsburgh, Pennsylvania	Inactive	
University of Puerto Rico	19xx ? – August 1, 1925	University of Puerto Rico, Río Piedras Campus	San Juan, Puerto Rico	Inactive	
University of Puget Sound	19xx ? – May 1, 1992	University of Puget Sound	Tacoma, Washington	Inactive	
University of Sioux Falls	19xx ? – October 1, 1999	University of Sioux Falls	Sioux Falls, South Dakota	Inactive	
University of South Carolina Aiken	19xx ? – February 1, 2000	University of South Carolina Aiken	Aiken, South Carolina	Inactive	
University of South Carolina Upstate	xxxx ? – February 1, 2007	University of South Carolina Upstate	Spartanburg, South Carolina	Inactive	
University of Texas at Tyler	19xx ? – July 1, 1999	University of Texas at Tyler	Tyler, Texas	Inactive	
University of Toledo	xxxx ? – April 1, 2014	University of Toledo	Toledo, Ohio	Inactive	
University of Wisconsin - Eau Claire	19xx ? – February 1, 1992	University of Wisconsin–Eau Claire	Eau Claire, Wisconsin	Inactive	
Urbana University	xxxx ? – March 1, 2018	Urbana University	Urbana, Ohio	Inactive	
Valley City State College	19xx ? – September 1, 1981	Valley City State College	Valley City, North Dakota	Inactive	
**Vermont State University Castleton**	19xx ?	Vermont State University	Castleton, Vermont	Active	(Note: Chapter formed at Castleton State College, later called Castleton University. In July 2023, Castleton University merged with Northern Vermont University and Vermont Technical College to form Vermont State University.)
Virginia Commonwealth University	19xx ? – May 1, 1970	Virginia Commonwealth University	Richmond, Virginia	Inactive	
Virginia Intermont College	19xx ? – May 1, 1988	Virginia Intermont College	Bristol, Virginia	Inactive	
Virginia Union University	19xx ? – April 1, 1978	Virginia Union University	Richmond, Virginia	Inactive	
Vorhees College	19xx ? – April 1, 2004	Voorhees College	Denmark, South Carolina	Inactive	
Weber State University	xxxx ? – April 1, 2006	Weber State University	Ogden, Utah	Inactive	
West Virginia State University	1937 – March 1, 2015	West Virginia State University	Institute, West Virginia	Inactive	
Widener College	xxxx ? – May 1, 2007	Widener University	Chester, Pennsylvania	Inactive	

== Delta Psi Omega chapters ==
Delta Psi Omega refers to its chapters as casts. Following are the casts of Delta Psi Omega, with active chapters in bold and inactive chapters and institutions in italics. The first 53 of these chapters were part of the launch of Delta Psi Omega in 1929.

Cast no.	Chapter	Charter date and range	Institution	Location	Status	Ref.
1	Modesto Junior College	December 19, 1929 – March 1, 1979	Modesto Junior College	Modesto, California	Inactive	(Note: Chapter formed from the Modesto Junior College Players.)
2 (First)	Alderson-Broddus College	1929–xxxx ?	Alderson-Broaddus College	Philippi, West Virginia	Inactive	
2	State University of New York at Cobleskill	19xx ? – May 1, 1997	State University of New York at Cobleskill	Cobleskill, New York	Inactive	
3	State A&M College	1929–xxxx ?	First District Agricultural and Mechanical College	Jonesboro, Arkansas	Inactive	
4	Intermont College	1929–xxxx ?	Virginia Intermont College	Bristol, Virginia	Inactive	
5	Phoenix College	April 1929 – September 1, 1983	Phoenix College	Phoenix, Arizona	Inactive	(Note: Chapter formed at Phoenix Junior College, now Phoenix College.)
6	Northern Oklahoma College	May 1929 – August 1, 1999	Northern Oklahoma College	Tonkawa, Oklahoma	Inactive	(Note: Chapter formed at Northern Oklahoma Junior College, now Northern Oklahoma College.)
7	Hamilton College	May 10, 1929 – xxxx ?	Hamilton College	Lexington, Kentucky	Inactive	
8	Columbia College	1929–xxxx ?	Columbia College	Columbia, Missouri	Inactive	(Note: Chapter formed at Christian College, now called Columbia College.)
9	Sullins College	April 1929 – xxxx ?	Sullins College	Bristol, Virginia	Inactive	
10	Hillman College	1929–c. 1942	Hillman College	Clinton, Mississippi	Inactive	(Note: Hillman College closed in 1942.)
11	Rochester Junior College	May 1, 1929 – July 1, 1969	Rochester State Junior College	Rochester, Minnesota	Inactive	(Note: Chapter formed from the Rajesters (local) at Rochester Junior College, which became Rochester State Junior College in 1964 and is now called Rochester Community and Technical College.)
12	Brawley Junior College	1929–c. 1947	Brawley Junior College	Brawley, California	Inactive	(Note: Brawley Junior College closed in 1947.)
13	Lamar Junior College	1929 – May 1, 1972	Lamar Junior College	Lamar, Colorado	Inactive	
14	Averette College	April 1929 – 19xx ?	Averett College	Danville, Virginia	Inactive	(Note: Chapter formed from the Averett College Dramatic Club. The college became a four-year institution in 1969.)
15	Dodd College	1929–c. 1942	Dodd College	Shreveport, Louisiana	Inactive	(Note: Dodd College closed in 1942.)
16	Hibbing Community College	April 1929 – May 1, 1971	Hibbing Community College	Hibbing, Minnesota	Inactive	(Note: Chapter formed at Hibbing Junior College, later called Hibbing Community College.)
17	North Dakota State University	May 8, 1929 – March 1, 1977	North Dakota State University-Bottineau Branch	Bottineau, North Dakota	Inactive	(Note: Chapter formed at the North Dakota State School of Forestry, which became the North Dakota State University-Bottineau Branch in 1968.)
18	Pasadena City College	1929 – November 1, 1970	Pasadena City College	Pasadena, California	Inactive	(Note: Chapter formed at Pasadena Junior College, which became Pasadena City College in 1947.)
19	New Jersey State Normal School	1929–xxxx ?	New Jersey State Normal School at Paterson	Paterson, New Jersey	Inactive	
20 (First)	Sacramento City College	May 11, 1929 – January 1, 1975	Sacramento City College	Sacramento, California	Inactive	(Note: Chapter formed at Sacramento Junior College, now called Sacramento City College.)
20	Lee College	19xx ? – December 1, 1970	Lee College	Baytown, Texas	Inactive	
21	Eastern Montana	1929–xxxx ?	Eastern Montana Normal School	Billings, Montana	Inactive	
22	Martha Washington College	April 1929–c. 1931	Martha Washington College	Abingdon, Virginia	Inactive	(Note: Martha Washington College closed in 1931.)
23	**Andrew College**	1929–xxxx ?	Andrew College	Cuthbert, Georgia	Active	
24	Whitewater Teachers College	1929–xxxx ?	Whitewater Teachers College	Whitewater, Wisconsin	Inactive	(Note: Chapter formed at Whitewater Teachers College, now University of Wisconsin–Whitewater.)
25	Wesley College	April 1929 – c. 1938	Wesley College	Greenville, Texas	Inactive	
26	Labette Community College	1929 – July 1, 1993	Labette Community College	Parsons, Kansas	Inactive	(Note: Chapter formed at Parsons Junior College, now Labette Community College.)
27	Shimer School	1929–xxxx ?	Frances Shimer School	Mount Carroll, Illinois	Inactive	
28	Muskegon Community College	May 1929 – May 1, 1971	Muskegon Community College	Muskegon, Michigan	Inactive	(Note: Chapter formed at Muskegon Junior College, which became Muskegon Community College in 1951.)
29	Flint Junior College	1929–xxxx ?	Flint Junior College	Flint, Michigan	Inactive	
30	Oneonta State Normal School	1929–xxxx ?	Oneonta State Normal School	Oneonta, New York	Inactive	(Note: Oneonta State Normal School is now the State University of New York at Oneonta.)
31	Elon College	1929–xxxx ?	Elon College	Elon, North Carolina	Inactive	
32	Washington State Normal School	April 1929 – xxxx ?	Washington State Normal School	Machias, Maine	Inactive	(Note: Washington State Normal School is now the University of Maine at Machias.)
33	San Bernardino Valley College	May 1, 1929 – June 1, 1952	San Bernardino Valley College	San Bernardino, California	Inactive	(Note: Chapter formed at San Bernardino Junior College, now San Bernardino Valley College.)
34	Westminster College	May 1929 – xxxx ?	Westminster College	Salt Lake City, Utah	Inactive	
35	Fullerton College	April 1929 – May 1, 1957	Fullerton College	Fullerton, California	Inactive	
36	Gainesville Junior College	1929–xxxx ?	Gainesville Junior College	Gainesville, Texas	Inactive	
37	Mars Hill College	April 1929 – xxxx ?	Mars Hill College	Mars Hill, North Carolina	Inactive	
38	Blackstone College	1929–c. 1950	Blackstone College for Girls	Blackstone, Virginia	Inactive	(Note: Blackstone College closed in 1950.)
39	Oswego State Normal School	1929–xxxx ?	Oswego State Teachers College	Oswego, New York	Inactive	
40	Georgia Normal School	1929–xxxx ?	Georgia Teachers College	Statesboro, Georgia	Inactive	(Note: Chapter formed at the Georgia Normal School, later called Georgia Teachers College and now Georgia Southern University.)
41	Lewiston State Normal School	April 1929 – xxxx ?	Lewiston State Normal School	Lewiston, Idaho	Inactive	
	San Bernardino Valley Union Junior College	March 1929	San Bernardino Valley Union Junior College	San Bernardino, California	Inactive	
	Mansfield College	April 1929 – 1930	Mansfield Female College	Mansfield, Louisiana	Inactive	(Note: Mansfield Female College merged with Centenary College in Shreveport in 1930.)
	Lucy Cobb Institute	April 1929 – c. 1931	Lucy Cobb Institute	Athens, Georgia	Inactive	(Note: The institute closed in 1931.)
	Shepherd College	April 1929 – xxxx ?	Shepherd College	Shepherdstown, West Virginia	Inactive	
42	Coffeyville Community Junior College	1929 – October 1, 1996	Coffeyville Community College	Coffeyville, Kansas	Inactive	
43	Glenville State College	1929–xxxx ?	Glenville State College	Glenville, West Virginia	Inactive	
44	Bay City Junior College	1929–c. 1961	Bay City Junior College	Bay City, Michigan	Inactive	(Note: Bay City Junior College was replaced by Delta College in 1961.)
45	Dickinson State Normal School	May 21, 1929 – xxxx ?	Dickinson State Normal School	Dickinson, North Dakota	Inactive	
46	Burlington Junior College	1929–c. 1961	Burlington Junior College	Burlington, Iowa	Inactive	(Note: Chapter formed at Burlington Junior College, which merged to form Southeastern Community College in 1967.)
47	Central College	1929–xxxx ?	Central College	Conway, Arkansas	Inactive	
48	Vincennes University	1929 – March 1, 1974	Vincennes University	Vincennes, Indiana	Inactive	
49	Eveleth Junior College	1929–xxxx ?	Eveleth Junior College	Eveleth, Minnesota	Inactive	
50	College of San Mateo	1929 – XXXX	College of San Mateo	San Mateo, California	Inactive	
51	Santa Maria Junior College	May 20, 1929 – xxxx ?	Santa Maria Junior College	Santa Maria, California	Inactive	
52	Hinds Junior College	1929 – May 1, 1970	Hinds Community College	Raymond, Mississippi	Inactive	
53	Bakersfield College	1929 – March 1, 1966	Bakersfield College	Bakersfield, California	Inactive	
	South Park Junior College	October 1929 – xxxx ?	South Park Junior College	Beaumont, Texas	Inactive	(Note: Formed from the South Park Curtain Club.)
54	Whitworth College	192x ?–c. 1938	Whitworth Female College	Brookhaven, Mississippi	Inactive	(Note: The college ceased operations and merged with Millsaps College in 1938.)
55	Paris Junior College	192x ?–xxxx ?	Paris Junior College	Paris, Texas	Inactive	
56	Crescent College	192x ?–c. 1934	Crescent College	Eureka Springs, Arkansas	Inactive	(Note: The college ceased operations in 1934.)
57	Montana State Normal School	192x ?–xxxx ?	Montana State Normal School	Dillon, Montana	Inactive	
58	Compton Community College	19xx ? – June 1, 1958	Compton Community College	Compton, California	Inactive	
59	Albion State Teachers College	19xx ?–1951	Albion State Teachers College	Albion, Idaho	Inactive	(Note: The college closed in 1951.)
60	Belmont Abbey College	19xx ?–xxxx ?	Belmont Abbey College	Belmont, North Carolina	Inactive	
61	Jacksonville College	19xx ? – January 1, 2003	Jacksonville College	Jacksonville, Texas	Inactive	
62	Marion College	19xx ?–c. 1967	Marion College	Marion, Virginia	Inactive	(Note: Marion College closed in 1967.)
63	Marshalltown Junior College	19xx ? – May 1, 1985	Marshalltown Community College	Marshalltown, Iowa	Inactive	
64	Marin Union Junior College	19xx ?–xxxx ?	Marin Union Junior College	Kentfield, California	Inactive	
65	Northeastern State College	19xx ?–xxxx ?	Northeastern State College	Tahlequah, Oklahoma	Inactive	
66	Pomona Junior College	19xx ?–xxxx ?	Pomona Junior College	Pomona, California	Inactive	
67	Glendale Junior College	19xx ?–xxxx ?	Glendale Junior College	Glendale, California	Inactive	
68	Mesabi Community College	19xx ? – March 1, 1995	Minnesota North College – Mesabi Range Virginia	Virginia, Minnesota	Inactive	(Note: Chapter formed at Virginia Junior, now called Minnesota North College – Mesabi Range Virginia.)
69	Wartburg College	19xx ?–xxxx ?	Wartburg College	Waverly, Iowa	Inactive	
70	Albright College	19xx ?–xxxx ?	Albright College	Reading, Pennsylvania	Inactive	
71	Sioux Falls College	19xx ?–xxxx ?	Sioux Falls College	Sioux Falls, South Dakota	Inactive	
72	Chaffey College	19xx ? – November 1, 1966	Chaffey College	Alta Loma, Rancho Cucamonga, California	Inactive	
73	Santa Rosa Junior College	19xx ? – January 1, 1968	Santa Rosa Junior College	Santa Rosa, California	Inactive	
74	Eastern State Normal School	19xx ?–xxxx ?	Eastern State Teachers College	Madison, South Dakota	Inactive	
75	Washington Junior College	19xx ?–xxxx ?	Washington Junior College	Washington, Iowa	Inactive	
76	Southern State Normal School	19xx ?–xxxx ?	Southern State Normal School	Springfield, South Dakota	Inactive	
77	Arlington Hall	19xx ?–c. 1942	Arlington Hall	Washington, D.C.	Inactive	(Note: Arlington Hall closed when the U.S. Army used its campus during World War II.)
78	Belhaven College	19xx ?–xxxx ?	Belhaven College	Jackson, Mississippi	Inactive	
79	Elkader Junior College	19xx ?–c. 1947	Elkader Junior College	Elkader, Iowa	Inactive	(Note: The junior college closed in 1947.)
80	Ellisworth Junior College	19xx ? – May 1, 1983	Ellsworth Community College	Iowa Falls, Iowa	Inactive	
81	Gooding College	19xx ?–c. 1938	Gooding College	Gooding, Idaho	Inactive	(Note: The college closed in 1938.)
82	Garden City Community Junior College	19xx ? – May 1, 1969	Garden City Community College	Garden City, Kansas	Inactive	
83	University of Idaho	19xx ?–xxxx ?	University of Idaho—Southern Branch	Pocatello, Idaho	Inactive	
84	College of Marshall	19xx ?–xxxx ?	College of Marshall	Marshall, Texas	Inactive	
85	Salem College	19xx ?–xxxx ?	Salem College	Salem, West Virginia	Inactive	
86	North Iowa Community College	19xx ? – April 1, 1987	North Iowa Area Community College	Mason City, Iowa	Inactive	(Note: Chapter formed at Mason City Junior College, later called North Iowa Area Community College.)
87	Hiwasee College	19xx ? – September 1, 1989	Hiwassee College	Madisonville, Tennessee	Inactive	
88	Rio Grande College	19xx ?–xxxx ?	Rio Grande College	Rio Grande, Ohio	Inactive	
89	Yuba College	19xx ? – April 1, 1968	Yuba College	Marysville, California	Inactive	
90	Cameron State Agricultural College	19xx ?–xxxx ?	Cameron State Agricultural College	Lawton, Oklahoma	Inactive	
91	University of Tennessee Junior College	19xx ?–xxxx ?	University of Tennessee Junior College	Martin, Tennessee	Inactive	
92	Central Wesleyan College	19xx ?–c. 1941	Central Wesleyan College	Warrenton, Missouri	Inactive	(Note: The college closed in 1941.)
93	Amarillo College	19xx ? – September 11, 2001	Amarillo College	Amarillo, Texas	Inactive	
96	**Eastern Arizona College**		Eastern Arizona College	Thatcher, Arizona	Active	
115	Northern Oklahoma College	19xx ?–xxxx ?	Northern Oklahoma College	Tonkawa, Oklahoma	Inactive	
159	Murray State College	19xx ?–xxxx ?	Murray State College	Tishomingo, Oklahoma	Inactive	
198	Middle Georgia College	19xx ? – April 1, 2011	Middle Georgia College	Cochran, Georgia	Inactive	
202	State College of Florida	19xx ? – April 1, 2024	State College of Florida, Manatee–Sarasota	Bradenton, Florida	Inactive	
245	Holmes Community College	19xx ? – April 1, 2012	Holmes Community College	Goodman, Mississippi	Inactive	
260	Mineral Area College	19xx ? – August 1, 2014	Mineral Area College	Park Hills, Missouri	Inactive	
295 (First)	Blinn College	19xx ? – June 1, 2014	Blinn College	Brenham, Texas	Inactive	
295	Tyler Junior College	xxxx ? – October 1, 2013	Tyler Junior College	Tyler, Texas	Inactive	
296	**Prince George's Community College**	19xx ?	Prince George's Community College	Largo, Maryland	Active	
306	**Bergen Community College**	2008	Bergen Community College	Paramus, New Jersey	Active	
332	Western Wyoming Community College	19xx ? – June 1, 1998	Western Wyoming Community College	Rock Springs, Wyoming	Inactive	
359	Mississippi Gulf Coast Junior College	19xx ? – May 1, 2001	Mississippi Gulf Coast Community College Jackson County Campus	Gautier, Mississippi	Inactive	
366		19xx ? – June 1, 1995	Rochester Christian University	Rochester Hills, Michigan	Inactive	(Note: Chapter formed at Michigan Christian College, now Rochester Christian University.)
367	Genesee Community College	19xx ? – June 1, 2001	Genesee Community College	Batavia, New York	Inactive	
384	Jacksonville College	19xx ?–xxxx ?	Jacksonville College	Jacksonville, Texas	Inactive	
385	Community College of Philadelphia	xxxx ? – November 1, 2015	Community College of Philadelphia	Philadelphia, Pennsylvania	Inactive	
386	Carl Sandburg College	xxxx ? – April 1, 2008	Carl Sandburg College	Galesburg, Illinois	Inactive	
387	Tarrant County College NE	xxxx ? – November 1, 2010	Tarrant County College Northeast Campus	Fort Worth, Texas	Inactive	
388	**University of Pittsburg at Greensburg**		University of Pittsburgh at Greensburg	Greensburg, Pennsylvania	Active	
389	**Lone Star College Montgomery**	xxxx ?	Lone Star College–Montgomery	Conroe, Texas	Active	
391	College of Southern Maryland	xxxx ? – September 1, 2012	College of Southern Maryland	La Plata, Maryland	Inactive	
392	Seward County Community College	xxxx ? – March 1, 2013	Seward County Community College	Liberal, Kansas	Inactive	
393	Blinn College--Bryan Campus	xxxx ? – January 1, 2015	Blinn College Bryan Campus	Bryan, Texas	Inactive	
394	Florida School of the Arts	xxxx ? – July 1, 2017	Florida School of the Arts	Palatka, Florida	Inactive	
395	Virginia Highlands Community College	xxxx ? – March 1, 2016	Virginia Highlands Community College	Abingdon, Virginia	Inactive	
396	**Tulsa Community College**	2016	Tulsa Community College	Tulsa, Oklahoma	Active	(Note: Chapter formed from the Theatre Student Association (local).)
397	SUNY Sullivan	xxxx ? – April 1, 2018	SUNY Sullivan	Loch Sheldrake, New York	Inactive	
397	College of DuPage	xxxx ? – May 1, 2018	College of DuPage	Glen Ellyn, Illinois	Inactive	
399	Truckee Meadows Community College	xxxx ? – June 1, 2019	Truckee Meadows Community College	Reno, Nevada	Inactive	
400	Santa Ana College	xxxx ? – January 1, 2020	Santa Ana College	Santa Ana, California	Inactive	
404	Aims Community College	197x ?– 197x ?; 2024	Aims Community College	Greeley, Colorado	Active	
	Abraham Baldwin College	19xx ? – June 1, 1970	Abraham Baldwin Agricultural College	Tifton, Georgia	Inactive	
	Allan Hancock College	19xx ? – May 1, 1965	Allan Hancock College	Santa Maria, California	Inactive	
	Alvin Community College	19xx ? – February 4, 1987	Alvin Community College	Alvin, Texas	Inactive	
	Anderson College	xxxx ? – April 30, 2008	Anderson College	Anderson, South Carolina	Inactive	
	Anne Arundel Community College	19xx ? – July 1, 1975	Anne Arundel Community College	Arnold, Maryland	Inactive	
	Antelope Valley College	19xx ? – December 1, 1971	Antelope Valley College	Lancaster, California	Inactive	
	Arapahoe Community College	19xx ? – June 1, 1971	Arapahoe Community College	Littleton, Colorado	Inactive	
	Arizona Western College	19xx ? – February 1, 1971	Arizona Western College	Yuma, Arizona	Inactive	
	Arkansas State University - Beebe	xxxx ? – November 19, 2015	Arkansas State University-Beebe	Beebe, Arkansas	Inactive	
	Austin Junior College	19xx ? – June 1, 1989	Austin Junior College	Austin, Minnesota	Inactive	
	Bacone College	19xx ? – April 1, 2003	Bacone College	Muskogee, Oklahoma	Inactive	
	Bee County College	19xx ? – April 1, 1988	Bee County Junior College	Beeville, Texas	Inactive	
	Belleville Area Community College	19xx ? – November 1, 1969	Belleville Area College	Belleville, Illinois	Inactive	(Note: Chapter was established at Belleville Junior College, which became Belleville Area College in 1967.)
	Bismarck Junior College	19xx ? – May 1, 1977	Bismarck Junior College	Bismarck, North Dakota	Inactive	
	Black Hawk College	19xx ? – May 1, 1988	Black Hawk College	Moline, Illinois	Inactive	
	Boise Junior College	1946–1965	Boise Junior College	Boise, Idaho	Inactive	(Note: Boise Junior College transitioned to the four-year Boise College in 1965.)
	Brevard Community College	19xx ? – April 27, 1970	Brevard Community College	Cocoa, Florida	Inactive	
	Brewton Parker College	19xx ? – April 1, 1984	Brewton–Parker College	Mount Vernon, Georgia	Inactive	
	Bronx County Community College	19xx ? – May 1, 1982	Bronx Community College	The Bronx, New York City, New York	Inactive	
	Broome Community College	19xx ? – May 1, 1962	SUNY Broome Community College	Binghamton, New York	Inactive	
	Broward Community College	19xx ? – December 1, 1996	Broward College	Fort Lauderdale, Florida	Inactive	
	Burlington County College	19xx ? – May 1, 1971	Burlington County College Pemberton Campus	Pemberton, New Jersey	Inactive	
	Butler County Community College	19xx ? – February 1, 1985	Butler Community College	El Dorado, Kansas	Inactive	
	Casper College	19xx ? – March 1, 1987	Casper College	Casper, Wyoming	Inactive	
	Cazenovia College	19xx ? – May 1, 1962	Cazenovia College	Cazenovia, New York	Inactive	
	Cecil Community College	19xx ? – May 1, 1978	Cecil Community College	North East, Maryland	Inactive	
	Central Community College, Platte Campus	19xx ? – April 1, 1984	Central Community College, Columbus Campus	Columbus, Nebraska	Inactive	
	Central Lakes College	19xx ? – May 1, 1955; 1999–20xx ?	Central Lakes College	Brainerd, Minnesota	Inactive	
	Central Piedmont Community College	19xx ? – August 1, 1973	Central Piedmont Community College	Charlotte, North Carolina	Inactive	
	Central Wyoming College	19xx ? – January 1, 1983	Central Wyoming College	Riverton, Wyoming	Inactive	
	Cerro Coso Community College	19xx ? – February 1, 1972	Cerro Coso Community College	Ridgecrest, California	Inactive	
	Champlain College	19xx ? – September 1, 1963	Champlain College	Burlington, Vermont	Inactive	
	Chowan College	19xx ? – July 1, 1975	Chowan College	Murfreesboro, North Carolina	Inactive	
	Cisco Junior College	19xx ? – May 1, 1997	Cisco Junior College	Cisco, Texas	Inactive	
	Clinton Community College	19xx ? – May 1, 1970	Clinton Community College	Clinton, Iowa	Inactive	
	Cloud County Community College	19xx ? – December 1, 1982	Cloud County Community College	Concordia, Kansas	Inactive	
	Colby Community College	19xx ? – May 1, 1986	Colby Community Junior College	Colby, Kansas	Inactive	
	College of Alameda	19xx ? – November 1, 1976	College of Alameda	Alameda, California	Inactive	
	College of Eastern Utah	19xx ? – January 1, 1970	College of Eastern Utah	Price, Utah	Inactive	
	College of Southern Idaho	19xx ? – May 1, 2003	College of Southern Idaho	Twin Falls, Idaho	Inactive	
	College of the Albermarle	19xx ? – October 1, 2002	College of The Albemarle	Elizabeth City, North Carolina	Inactive	
	College of the Sequois	19xx ? – October 1, 1994	College of the Sequoias	Visalia, California	Inactive	
	Columbia State Community College		Columbia State Community College	Texas	Inactive	
	Community College of Baltimore	19xx ? – May 1, 1992	Community College of Baltimore	Baltimore, Maryland	Inactive	
	Community College of the Finger Lakes	19xx ? – June 1, 1967	Finger Lakes Community College	Canandaigua, New York	Inactive	
	Connors College	19xx ? – August 1, 1969	Connors State College	Warner, Oklahoma	Inactive	
	Copiah-Lincoln Junior College	19xx ? – May 1, 1985	Copiah–Lincoln Community College	Wesson, Mississippi	Inactive	
	Crowder College	19xx ? – September 1, 1991	Crowder College	Neosho, Missouri	Inactive	
	Darton College	xxxx ? – May 1, 2017	Darton State College	Albany, Georgia	Inactive	
	Daytona Beach Community College	19xx ? – November 1, 1996	Daytona Beach College	DeLand, Florida	Inactive	
	Del Mar College	19xx ? – August 1, 1970	Del Mar College	Corpus Christi, Texas	Inactive	
	Delgado Community College	xxxx ? – January 1, 2015	Delgado Community College	New Orleans, Louisiana	Inactive	
	Dixie Junior College	19xx ? – November 1, 1989	Dixie Junior College	St. George, Utah	Inactive	
	Dodge City Junior College	19xx ? – June 1, 1987	Dodge City Community College	Dodge City, Kansas	Inactive	
	Dutchess County Community College	xxxx ? – June 1, 2014	Dutchess Community College	Poughkeepsie, New York	Inactive	
	East Central Junior College	19xx ? – December 1, 1967	East Central Community College	Decatur, Mississippi	Inactive	
	East Los Angeles College	19xx ? – June 1, 1968	East Los Angeles College	Monterey Park, California	Inactive	
	East Mississippi Community College	19xx ? – May 1, 1998	East Mississippi Community College	Scooba, Mississippi	Inactive	
	Eastern Wyoming College	19xx ? – May 1, 1958	Eastern Wyoming College	Torrington, Wyoming	Inactive	
	Edison Community College	xxxx ? – May 1, 2012	Edison Community College, Florida	Fort Myers, Florida	Inactive	
	Emmanuel College	19xx ? – February 1, 1984	Emmanuel College	Franklin Springs, Georgia	Inactive	
	Endicott College	19xx ? – May 1, 1972	Endicott College	Beverly, Massachusetts	Inactive	
	Foothill College	19xx ? – May 1, 1974	Foothill College	Los Altos Hills, California	Inactive	
	Fort Scott Community Junior College	19xx ? – May 1, 1941	Fort Scott Community College	Fort Scott, Kansas	Inactive	
	Frank Phillips College	19xx ? – September 1, 1985	Frank Phillips College	Borger, Texas	Inactive	
	Frederick Community College	xxxx ?	Frederick Community College	Frederick, Maryland	Inactive	
	Fresno City College	19xx ? – May 1, 2000	Fresno City College	Fresno, California	Inactive	
	Galveston College	19xx ? – November 1, 1986	Galveston College	Galveston, Texas	Inactive	
	**Glendale Community College**		Glendale Community College	Glendale, Arizona	Active	
	Gloucester County College	19xx ? – June 1, 1974	Gloucester County College	Sewell, New Jersey	Inactive	
	Gray's Harbor College	19xx ? – January 1, 1987	Grays Harbor College	Aberdeen, Washington	Inactive	
	Grayson County College	19xx ? – April 1, 1990	Grayson College	Denison, Texas	Inactive	
	Grossmont College	19xx ? – July 1, 1967	Grossmont College	El Cajon, California	Inactive	
	Harcum Junior College	19xx ? – April 1, 1964	Harcum Junior College	Bryn Mawr, Pennsylvania	Inactive	
	Harford Junior College	19xx ? – April 1, 1971	Harford Junior College	Bel Air, Maryland	Inactive	
	Hartnell College	19xx ? – June 1, 1974	Hartnell College	Salinas, California	Inactive	
	Henry Ford Community College	19xx ? – May 1, 1959	Henry Ford College	Dearborn, Michigan	Inactive	
	Herkimer County Community College	19xx ? – November 1, 2002	Herkimer County Community College	Herkimer, New York	Inactive	
	Highland Community Junior College	19xx ? – April 1, 1985	Highland Community College	Highland, Kansas	Inactive	
	Hill Junior College	19xx ? – October 1, 1969	Hill College	Hillsboro, Texas	Inactive	
	Houston Community College	19xx ? – April 1, 1999	Houston Community College	Stafford, Texas	Inactive	
	Hutchinson Community College	xxxx ? – March 1, 2021	Hutchinson Community College	Hutchinson, Kansas	Inactive	
	Illinois Central	19xx ? – October 1, 1996	Illinois Central College	Jacksonville, Illinois	Inactive	
	Illinois Valley Community College	19xx ? – May 1, 2000	Illinois Valley Community College	Oglesby, Illinois	Inactive	
	Independence Community College	xxxx ? – May 1, 2021	Independence Community College	Independence, Kansas	Inactive	
	Indian River Community College	19xx ? – November 1, 1970	Indian River State College	Fort Pierce, Florida	Inactive	
	Iowa Lakes College	19xx ? – May 1, 1971	Iowa Lakes Community College	Estherville, Iowa	Inactive	
	Itawamba Junior College	19xx ? – September 1, 2001	Itawamba Community College	Fulton, Mississippi	Inactive	
	Jackson Community College	19xx ? – May 1, 1966	Jackson Community College	Jackson, Michigan	Inactive	
	Jackson State Community College	19xx ? – June 1, 2004	Jackson State Community College	Jackson, Tennessee	Inactive	
	Jefferson State Junior College	19xx ? – May 1, 1984	Jefferson State Junior College	Birmingham, Alabama	Inactive	
	Johnson County Community College	19xx ? – May 1, 1984	Johnson County Community College	Overland Park, Kansas	Inactive	
	**Joliet Junior College**	1973	Joliet Junior College	Shorewood, Illinois	Active	
	Kalamazoo Valley Community College	19xx ? – May 1, 1978	Kalamazoo Valley Community College	Kalamazoo, Michigan	Inactive	
	Kansas City Kansas Community College	19xx ? – June 1, 1985	Kansas City Kansas Community College	Kansas City, Kansas	Inactive	
	Kaskaskia College	xxxx ? – November 1, 2023	Kaskaskia College	Centralia, Illinois	Inactive	
	Kellogg Community College	19xx ? – April 1, 1977	Kellogg Community College	Battle Creek, Michigan	Inactive	
	Keystone College	19xx ? – May 1, 2000	Keystone College	La Plume, Pennsylvania	Inactive	
	Kilgore College	19xx ? – December 1, 2001	Kilgore College	Kilgore, Texas	Inactive	
	Lake Michigan College	19xx ? – April 1, 1987	Lake Michigan College	Benton Harbor, Michigan	Inactive	
	Lasell Junior College	19xx ? – May 1, 1963	Lasell Junior College	Auburndale, Massachusetts	Inactive	
	Lewis and Clark Community College	19xx ? – March 1, 1997	Lewis and Clark Community College	Godfrey, Illinois	Inactive	
	Lincoln Christian College	19xx ? – May 1, 1975	Lincoln Christian College	Lincoln, Illinois	Inactive	
	Lincoln Land Community College	19xx ? – December 1, 1979	Lincoln Land Community College	Springfield, Illinois	Inactive	
	Lon Morris College	19xx ? – May 1, 1995	Lon Morris College	Jacksonville, Texas	Inactive	
	Lone Star College-CyFair		Lone Star College–CyFair	Cypress, Texas	Inactive	
	Long Beach City College	19xx ? – October 1, 1967	Long Beach City College	Long Beach, California	Inactive	
	Loraine County Community College	19xx ? – June 1, 1976	Loraine County Community College	Elyria, Ohio	Inactive	
	Louisburg College	19xx ? – June 1, 1996	Louisburg College	Louisburg, North Carolina	Inactive	
	Lower Columbia College	19xx ? – May 1, 1967	Lower Columbia College	Longview, Washington	Inactive	
	Macomb Community College	19xx ? – February 1, 1995	Macomb Community College	Mount Clemens, Michigan	Inactive	
	Madisonville Community College	19xx ? – June 1, 1989	Madisonville Community College	Madisonville, Kentucky	Inactive	
	Manchester Community College		Manchester Community College	Manchester, Connecticut	Inactive	
	Martin Methodist College	19xx ? – April 1, 1995	Martin Methodist College	Pulaski, Tennessee	Inactive	
	Mary Holmes College	19xx ? – April 1, 1988	Mary Holmes College	West Point, Mississippi	Inactive	
	McLennan Community College	19xx ? – February 1, 1996	McLennan Community College	Waco, Texas	Inactive	
	Mercer County Community College	19xx ? – June 1, 1979	Mercer County Community College	Trenton, New Jersey	Inactive	
	Meredian Junior College	19xx ? – January 1, 1982	Meredian Junior College	Meridian, Mississippi	Inactive	
	Mesa College	19xx ? – December 1, 1989; 199x ? – May 1, 1993	San Diego Mesa College	Clairemont Mesa, San Diego, California	Inactive	
	Miami-Dade Community College, North	19xx ? – September 1, 1998	Miami-Dade Community College, North	Miami, Florida	Inactive	
	Mississippi Gulf Coast College	19xx ? – April 1, 1984	Mississippi Gulf Coast Community College	Perkinston, Mississippi	Inactive	
	Mississippi Gulf Coast Community College	xxxx ? – November 1, 2014	Mississippi Gulf Coast Community College	Gulfport, Mississippi	Inactive	
	Mitchell College	19xx ? – July 1, 1983	Mitchell Community College	Statesville, North Carolina	Inactive	
	Moberly Junior College	19xx ? – May 1, 1988	Moberly Junior College	Moberly, Missouri	Inactive	
	Monroe Community College	19xx ? – June 1, 1985	Monroe Community College	Rochester, New York	Inactive	
	Montgomery College Takoma Park Campus	19xx ? – June 1, 1957	Montgomery College Takoma Park Campus	Takoma Park, Maryland	Inactive	
	Moraine Valley Community College	19xx ? – September 1, 1988	Moraine Valley Community College	Palos Hills, Illinois	Inactive	
	Morristown College	19xx ? – May 1, 1969	Morristown College	Morristown, Tennessee	Inactive	
	Morrisville College	19xx ? – June 1, 1994	State University of New York at Morrisville	Morrisville, New York	Inactive	
	Morton Junior College	19xx ? – July 1, 1973	Morton Junior College	Cicero, Illinois	Inactive	
	Mount Aloysius Junior College		Mount Aloysius Junior College	Cresson, Pennsylvania	Inactive	(Note: Chapter formed as Delta Psi Omega at Mt. Aloysius Junior College, which became Mount Aloysius College in 1991. The chapter then became Alpha Psi Omega.)
	Mt. Hood Community College	19xx ? – April 1, 1973	Mt. Hood Community College	Gresham, Oregon	Inactive	
	Multinomah College	19xx ? – August 1, 1925	Multinomah College	Portland, Oregon	Inactive	
	Napa College	19xx ? – June 1, 1963	Napa Junior College	Napa, California	Inactive	
	Nassau Community College	19xx ? – March 1, 1970	Nassau Community College	East Garden City, New York	Inactive	
	National Conservatory of Dramatic Art	19xx ? – May 1, 2001	National Conservatory of Dramatic Arts	Washington, D.C.	Inactive	
	Naugatuck Valley Community-Technical College	19xx ? – May 1, 1985	Naugatuck Valley Community College	Waterbury, Connecticut	Inactive	
	Navarro College	19xx ? – June 1, 1988	Navarro College	Corsicana, Texas	Inactive	
	Neosha County Community College	19xx ? – April 1, 1996	Neosha County Community College	Chanute, Kansas	Inactive	
	New Hampshire Vocational Technical College	19xx ? – April 1, 1974	New Hampshire Vocational Technical College	Nashua, New Hampshire	Inactive	
	Niagara County Community College	19xx ? – July 1, 1969	Niagara County Community College	Niagara Falls, New York	Inactive	
	North Dakota State School of Science	19xx ? – April 1, 1984	North Dakota State College of Science	Wahpeton, North Dakota	Inactive	
	North Florida Junior College	19xx ? – January 1, 1962	North Florida Junior College	Madison, Florida	Inactive	
	North Harris County College	19xx ? – October 1, 1982	North Harris County College	Houston, Texas	Inactive	
	North Idaho College	19xx ? – May 1, 1948	North Idaho College	Coeur d'Alene, Idaho	Inactive	
	Northeast Mississippi Junior College	19xx ? – May 1, 2001	Northeast Mississippi Community College	Booneville, Mississippi	Inactive	(Note: Chapter formed at Northeast Mississippi Junior College, which became Northeast Mississippi Community College in 1987.)
	Northeastern Christian Junior College	19xx ? – May 1, 1987	Northeastern Christian Junior College	Villanova, Pennsylvania	Inactive	(Note: The college closed in 1993.)
	Northwest Community College	19xx ? – May 1, 1967	Northwest Community College	Powell, Wyoming	Inactive	
	Northwest Mississippi Junior College	19xx ? – April 1, 1967	Northwest Mississippi Junior College	Senatobia, Mississippi	Inactive	
	Oakton Community College	19xx ? – April 1, 1980	Oakton Community College	Morton Grove, Illinois	Inactive	
	Odessa Junior College	19xx ? – June 1, 1990	Odessa College	Odessa, Texas	Inactive	(Note: Chapter was founded at Odessa Junior College, which became Odessa College in 1976.)
	Ohio Valley College	19xx ? – February 1, 1992	Ohio Valley College	Parkersburg, West Virginia	Inactive	
	Okaloosa Walton Junior College	19xx ? – April 1, 1999	Okaloosa-Walton College	Niceville, Florida	Inactive	(Note: Chapter formed at Okaloosa Walton Junior College, which became Okaloosa-Walton College in 1988 and Okaloosa-Walton College 2in 003.)
	Olympic College	19xx ? – February 1, 1997	Olympic College	Bremerton, Washington	Inactive	
	Palomar College	19xx ? – December 1, 1974	Palomar College	San Marcos, California	Inactive	
	Pamola College	19xx ? – May 1, 1987	Pamola College	Carthage, Texas	Inactive	
	Paris Junior College	xxxx ? – December 1, 2013	Paris Junior College	Paris, Texas	Inactive	
	Parkersburg Community College	19xx ? – September 1, 1989	Parkersburg Community College	Parkersburg, West Virginia	Inactive	
	Pearl River Junior College	19xx ? – November 1, 1998	Pearl River Junior College	Poplarville, Mississippi	Inactive	
	Pellissippi State Technical	19xx ? – August 1, 2000	Pellissippi State Technical Community College	Knoxville, Tennessee	Inactive	
	Penn State University Beaver Campus	19xx ? – May 1, 1995	Penn State Beaver	Monaco, Pennsylvania	Inactive	
	Penn State University DuBois Campus	19xx ? – December 1, 1986	Pennsylvania State University DuBois Campus	DuBois, Pennsylvania	Inactive	
	Penn Valley Community College	19xx ? – September 1, 1972	Penn Valley Community College	Kansas City, Missouri	Inactive	
	Phillips County Community College	19xx ? – May 1, 2000	Phillips County Community College	Helena, Arkansas	Inactive	
	Polk Junior College	19xx ? – May 1, 1978	Polk Junior College	Winter Haven, Florida	Inactive	
	Porterville College	19xx ? – February 1, 1980	Porterville College	Porterville, California	Inactive	
	Potomac State College	19xx ? – May 1, 1976	Potomac State College	Keyser, West Virginia	Inactive	
	Prairie State College	19xx ? – January 1, 1972	Prairie State College	Chicago Heights, Illinois	Inactive	
	Pratt Community College	19xx ? – November 1, 1980	Pratt Community College	Pratt, Kansas	Inactive	
	Queensborough Community College	19xx ? – June 1, 1978	Queensborough Community College	Bayside, Queens, New York	Inactive	
	Ranger College	19xx ? – May 1, 2004	Ranger College	Ranger, Texas	Inactive	
	Reinhardt College	19xx ? – March 1, 1978	Reinhardt College	Waleska, Georgia	Inactive	
	Ricks College	19xx ? – April 1, 1970	Ricks College	Rexburg, Idaho	Inactive	
	Riverside City College	19xx ? – February 1, 1970	Riverside City College	Riverside, California	Inactive	
	Rose State College	xxxx ? – August 1, 2011	Rose State College	Midwest City, Oklahoma	Inactive	
	St. Louis Community College	19xx ? – May 1, 2000	St. Louis Community College	St. Louis, Missouri	Inactive	
	**San Antonio College**		San Antonio College	San Antonio, Texas	Active	
	San Jacinto College Central	19xx ? – May 1, 2000	San Jacinto College Central Campus	Pasadena, Texas	Inactive	
	San Joaquin College	19xx ? – May 1, 1996	San Joaquin Delta College	Stockton, California	Inactive	
	San Jose City College	19xx ? – June 1, 1958	San Jose City College	San Jose, California	Inactive	
	San Juan College	19xx ? – December 1, 2000	San Juan College	Farmington, New Mexico	Inactive	
	Sauk Valley College	19xx ? – February 1, 1973	Sauk Valley Community College	Dixon, Illinois	Inactive	
	Shelby State Community College	19xx ? – February 1, 1991	Shelby State Community College	Memphis, Tennessee	Inactive	
	Sheridan College	19xx ? – April 1, 1965	Sheridan College	Sheridan, Wyoming	Inactive	
	Shoreline Community College	19xx ? – March 1, 1968	Shoreline Community College	Shoreline, Washington	Inactive	
	Skagit Valley College	19xx ? – March 1, 1966	Skagit Valley College	Mount Vernon, Washington	Inactive	
	Solano College	19xx ? – March 1, 1991	Solano College	Suisun City, California	Inactive	
	South Georgia College	19xx ? – June 1, 1990	South Georgia State College	Douglas, Georgia	Inactive	
	South Plains College	19xx ? – February 1, 2003	South Plains College	Levelland, Texas	Inactive	
	Southeast Community College - Fairbury-Beatrice Campus	19xx ? – May 1, 1975	Southeast Community College - Fairbury-Beatrice Campus	Fairbury, Nebraska	Inactive	
	Southeastern Illinois College	19xx ? – February 1, 1996	Southeastern Illinois College	Harrisburg, Illinois	Inactive	
	Southern Seminary Junior College	19xx ? – April 1, 1986	Southern Seminary Junior College	Buena Vista, Virginia	Inactive	
	Southside Virginia Community College	19xx ? – June 1, 1977	Southside Virginia Community College	Alberta, Virginia	Inactive	
	Southwest Baptist College	19xx ? – April 1, 1981	Southwest Baptist College	Bolivar, Missouri	Inactive	
	Southwest Texas Junior College	19xx ? – November 1, 1989	Southwest Texas Junior College	Uvalde, Texas	Inactive	
	Southwestern Assembly of God College	19xx ? – May 1, 1982	Southwestern Assemblies of God University	Waxahachie, Texas	Inactive	
	Southwestern College	19xx ? – May 1, 1996	Southwestern College	Chula Vista, California	Inactive	
	Spartanburg Methodist College	19xx ? – July 1, 1998	Spartanburg Methodist College	Spartanburg, South Carolina	Inactive	
	Springfield College	19xx ? – May 1, 1954	Springfield College	Springfield, Illinois	Inactive	
	State Fair Community College	xxxx ? – May 1, 2024	State Fair Community College	Sedalia, Missouri	Inactive	
	State University of New York at Canton	19xx ? – May 1, 1972	State University of New York at Canton	Canton, New York	Inactive	
	State University of New York at Farmingdale	19xx ? – June 1, 1971	State University of New York at Farmingdale	Farmingdale, New York	Inactive	
	Suomi College	19xx ? – April 1, 1980	Suomi College	Hancock, Michigan.	Inactive	
	Taft College	19xx ? – May 1, 1950	Taft College	Taft, California	Inactive	
	Tallahassee Community College	19xx ? – April 1, 2001	Tallahassee Community College	Tallahassee, Florida	Inactive	
	Tarrant County College	19xx ? – January 1, 2001	Tarrant County College	Tarrant County, Texas	Inactive	
	Tarrant County Junior College	19xx ? – August 1, 2003	Tarrant County College South Campus	Fort Worth, Texas	Inactive	
	Temple Junior College	19xx ? – September 1, 1992	Temple Junior College	Temple, Texas	Inactive	
	Texarkana College	19xx ? – January 4, 1982	Texarkana College	Texarkana, Texas	Inactive	
	Texas Southmost College	19xx ? – May 1, 1971	Texas Southmost College	Brownsville, Texas	Inactive	
	Treasure Valley Community College	19xx ? – June 1, 1981	Treasure Valley Community College	Ontario, Oregon	Inactive	
	Trinidad State Junior College	19xx ? – June 1, 1974	Trinidad State Junior College	Trinidad, Colorado	Inactive	
	Truett-McConnell College	19xx ? – December 1, 1995	Truett-McConnell College	Cleveland, Georgia	Inactive	
	Ulster County Community College	19xx ? – September 1, 1978	Ulster County Community College	Stone Ridge, New York	Inactive	
	University of Charleston – Yawkey	xxxx ? – July 26, 2004	University of Charleston Yawkey	Yawkey, West Virginia	Inactive	
	University of Maine at Presque Isle	19xx ? – January 1, 1980	University of Maine at Presque Isle	Presque Isle, Maine	Inactive	
	University of Wisconsin - Barron County	19xx ? – May 1, 1983	University of Wisconsin-Barron County	Rice Lake, Wisconsin	Inactive	
	University of Wisconsin - Sheboygan	19xx ? – February 1, 1984	University of Wisconsin-Sheboygan	Sheboygan, Wisconsin	Inactive	
	University of Wisconsin - Waukesha	19xx ? – May 1, 1974	University of Wisconsin-Waukesha	Waukesha, Wisconsin	Inactive	
	Vernon Regional College	19xx ? – May 1, 1977	Vernon College	Vernon, Texas	Inactive	
	Victor Valley College	19xx ? – March 1, 1977	Victor Valley College	Victorville, California	Inactive	
	Virginia Western Community College	19xx ? – October 1, 1984	Virginia Western Community College	Roanoke, Virginia	Inactive	
	Volunteer State Community College	19xx ? – March 1, 2004	Volunteer State Community College	Gallatin, Tennessee	Inactive	
	Vorhees College	19xx ? – February 1, 1977	Walker College	Jasper, Alabama	Inactive	
	Washtenaw Community College	19xx ? – May 1, 1990	Washtenaw Community College	Ann Arbor Charter Township, Michigan	Inactive	
	Weatherford College	19xx ? – April 1, 1991	Weatherford College	Weatherford, Texas	Inactive	
	Wenatehee Valley College	19xx ? – September 1, 1953	Wenatchee Valley College	Wenatchee, Washington	Inactive	
	Wesley Junior College	19xx ? – May 1, 1981	Wesley College	Dover, Delaware	Inactive	
	Western Texas College	19xx ? – April 1, 1975	Western Texas College	Snyder, Texas	Inactive	
	Wharton County Junior College	19xx ? – August 1, 1988	Wharton County Junior College	Wharton, Texas	Inactive	
	Wingate Junior College	19xx ? – March 1, 1982	Wingate Junior College	Wingate, North Carolina	Inactive	
	Wood Junior College	19xx ? – July 1, 1976	Wood Junior College	Mathison, Mississippi	Inactive	
	Worthington Junior College	19xx ? – May 1, 1975	Worthington Community College	Worthington, Minnesota	Inactive	(Note: Chapter was established at Torrington Junior College, which became Worthington State Junior College in 1964 and Worthington Community College in 1973.)
	Wright College	19xx ? – April 1, 1976	Wilbur Wright College	Chicago, Illinois	Inactive	
	Yavapai College	19xx ? – May 1, 1974	Yavapai College	Prescott, Arizona	Inactive	
