= 1940 Pittsburgh Panthers football team =

American college football season

1940 Pittsburgh Panthers football
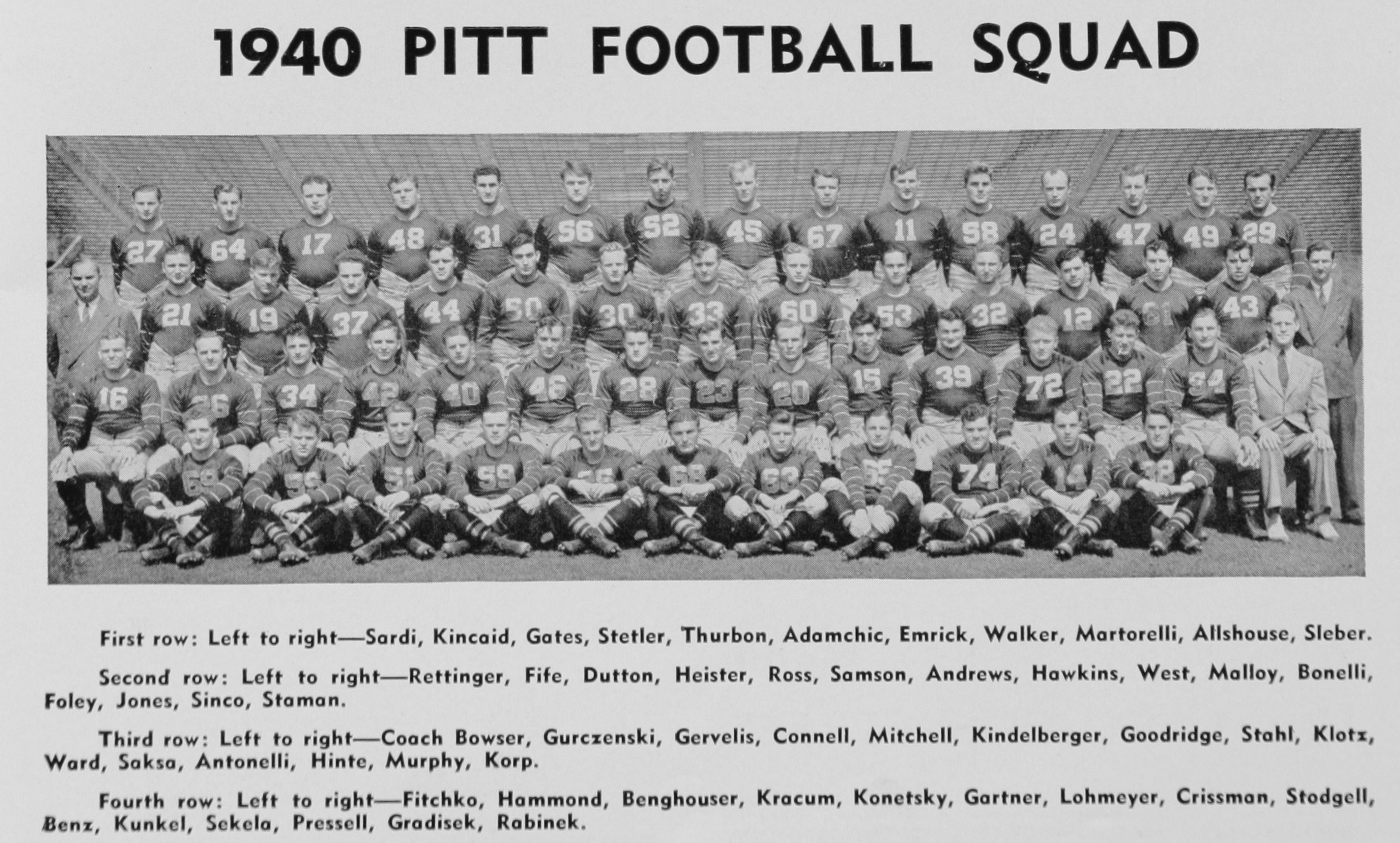
- Conference: Independent
- Record: 3–4–1
- Head coach: Charley Bowser (2nd season)
- Home stadium: Pitt Stadium

1940 Eastern college football independents records
	Conf.			Overall
Team	W	L	T	W		L		T
No. 5 Boston College		–		11	–	0	–	0
Duquesne		–		7	–	1	–	0
No. 14 Penn		–		6	–	1	–	1
Penn State		–		6	–	1	–	1
No. 12 Fordham		–		7	–	2	–	0
No. 15 Cornell		–		6	–	2	–	0
La Salle		–		6	–	2	–	0
Princeton		–		5	–	2	–	1
Columbia		–		5	–	2	–	2
Brown		–		6	–	3	–	1
Bucknell		–		4	–	2	–	2
Boston University		–		5	–	3	–	0
Colgate		–		5	–	3	–	0
Hofstra		–		4	–	3	–	0
Harvard		–		3	–	2	–	3
Dartmouth		–		5	–	4	–	0
Temple		–		4	–	4	–	1
Tufts		–		4	–	4	–	0
Vermont		–		4	–	4	–	0
Villanova		–		4	–	5	–	0
Pittsburgh		–		3	–	4	–	1
Syracuse		–		3	–	4	–	1
Buffalo		–		3	–	5	–	0
Carnegie Tech		–		3	–	5	–	0
Manhattan		–		3	–	6	–	0
Providence		–		3	–	6	–	0
NYU		–		2	–	7	–	0
Yale		–		1	–	7	–	0
Army		–		1	–	7	–	1
CCNY		–		1	–	5	–	1
Massachusetts State		–		1	–	8	–	0
Rankings from AP Poll

The 1940 Pittsburgh Panthers football team represented the University of Pittsburgh as an independent during the 1940 college football season. Led by second-year head coach Charley Bowser, the Panthers compiled a record of 3–4–1.

Pittsburgh was ranked at No. 30 (out of 697 college football teams) in the final rankings under the Litkenhous Difference by Score system for 1940.

The team played home games at Pitt Stadium in Pittsburgh.

== Schedule ==
Date	Opponent	Site	Result	Attendance	Source
September 28	at Ohio State	Ohio Stadium; Columbus, OH	L 7–30	52,877	
October 5	Missouri	Pitt Stadium; Pittsburgh, PA	W 19–13	26,000	
October 12	SMU	Pitt Stadium; Pittsburgh, PA	T 7–7	39,000	
October 19	No. 11 Fordham	Pitt Stadium; Pittsburgh, PA	L 12–24	40,000	
November 9	Carnegie Tech	Pitt Stadium; Pittsburgh, PA	W 6–0	26,500	
November 16	No. 11 Nebraska	Pitt Stadium; Pittsburgh, PA	L 7–9	22,000	
November 23	No. 20 Penn State	Pitt Stadium; Pittsburgh, PA (rivalry)	W 20–7	30,083	
November 30	at No. 20 Duke	Duke Stadium; Durham, NC	L 7–12	21,000–27,000	
Rankings from AP Poll released prior to the game

== Preseason ==
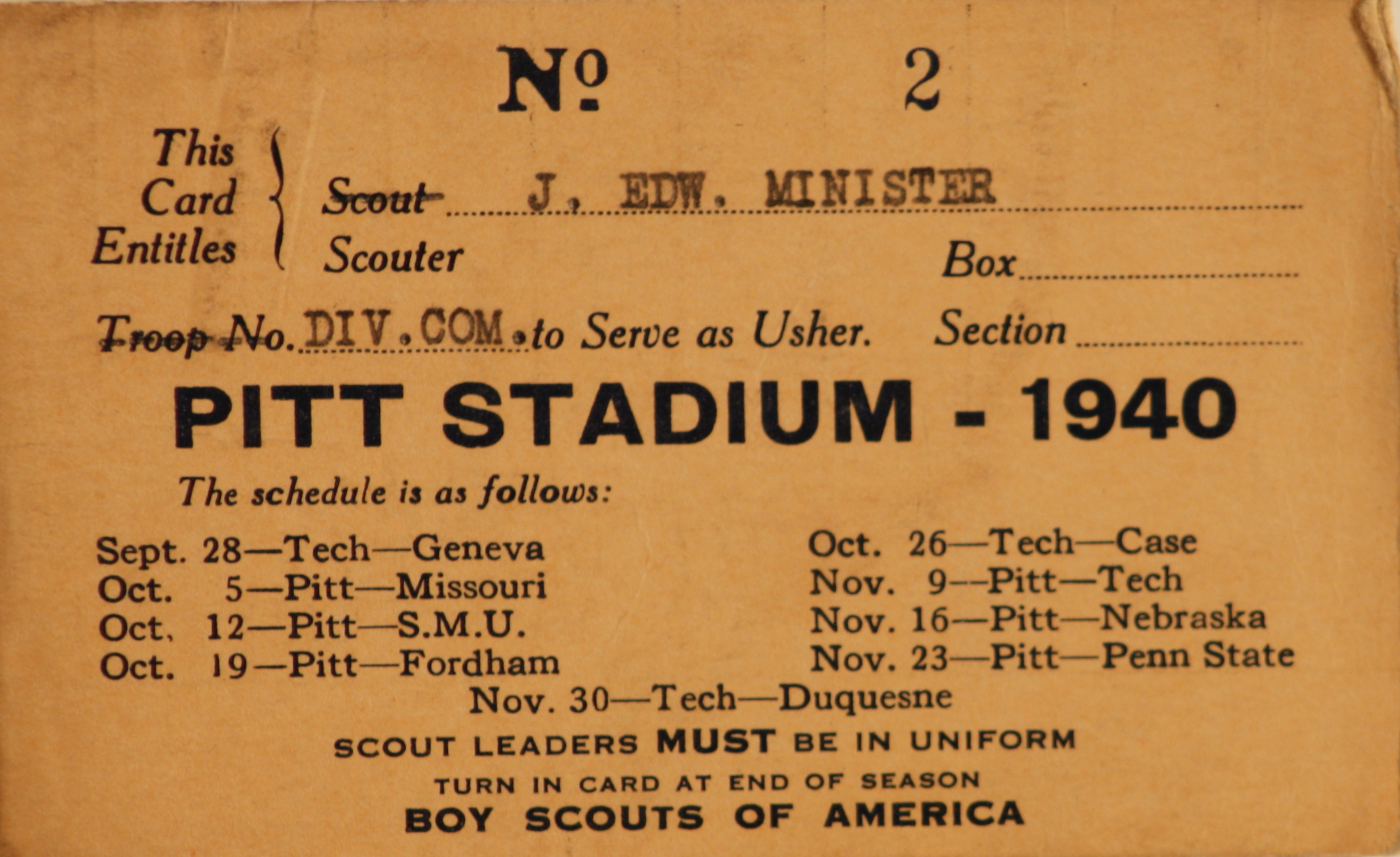
Boy Scout usher pass

On February 12, Coach Charles Bowser appointed Harold Stebbins and Luther Richards to his coaching staff. Stebbins replaced Mike Nicksick, who resigned and joined the staff at West Virginia. Richards replaced Walt Raskowski, who was finishing his dental degree. Henry Korp was named varsity manager for the 1940 season. Albert Stamen was appointed junior varsity football manager.

Spring practice commenced on March 14 after a freshman strike threat concerning the financial and working conditions of Code Bowman was thwarted by the Athletic Department. Sixty players, including 19 freshmen, appeared for the first session. The sessions ended on May 4 with a varsity scrimmage, which was the feature event of the Western Pennsylvania Scholastic Coaches' Association football clinic.

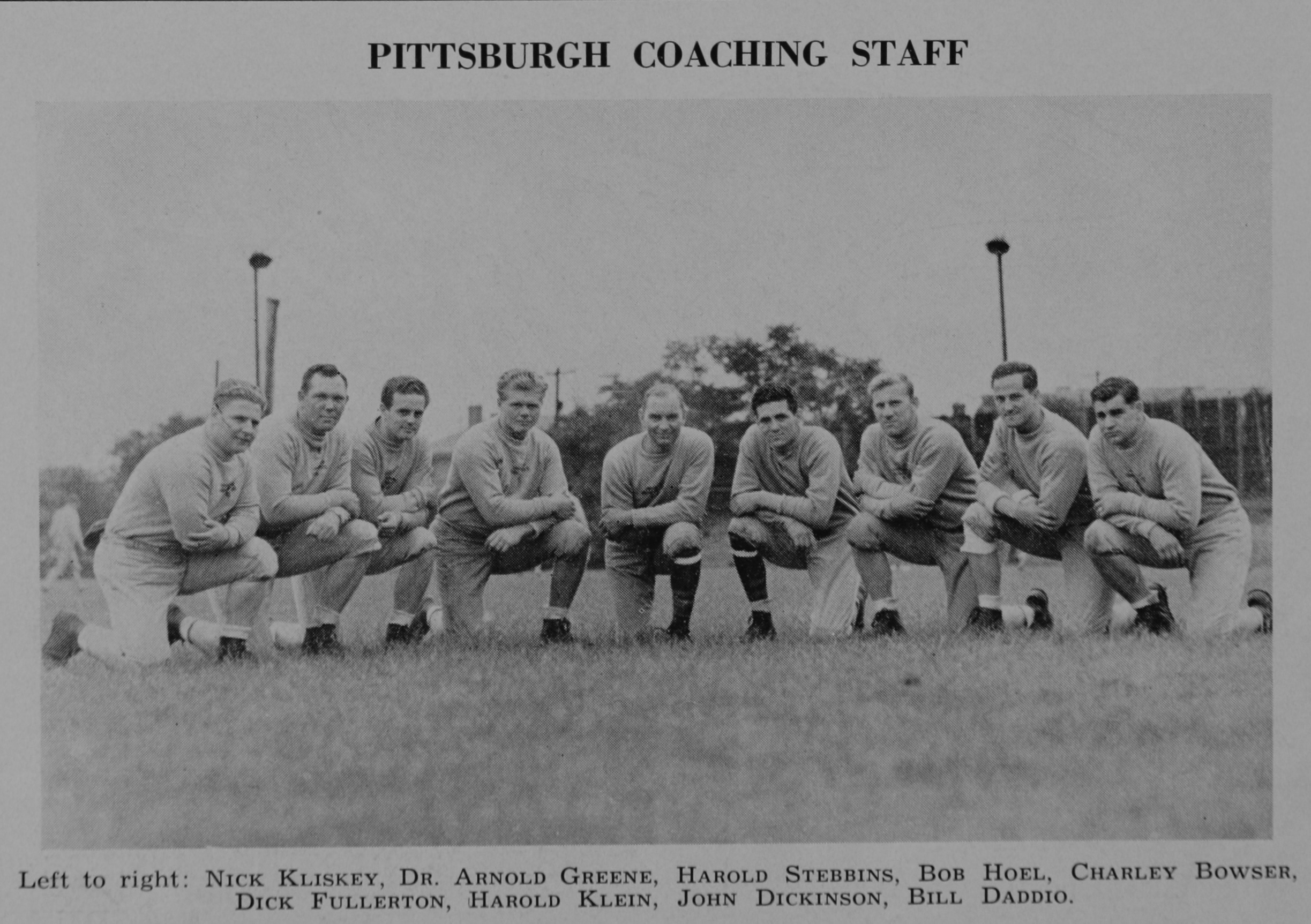
Pitt football coaches

On April 15, The Pitt News noted that Coach Bowser added three new coaches to his staff. Former Panthers Harold Klein, Dick Fullerton and John Dickinson were appointed as assistant freshmen team coaches while they continued their studies at the university.

On September 10, Coach Bowser welcomed a squad of 56 for the start of fall two-a-day practices. He was not optimistic: “We have a lot of hard work ahead of us. Our spring training didn't mean much, rain washing out most of our outdoor practices. We haven't the reserves necessary to meet the kind of schedule we'll be up against this year...”

Coach Bowser appointed tackle Ted Konetsky team captain for the 1940 season. Bowser announced that he would also name game captains to assist Konetsky. Konetsky was the first team captain since the 1934 season.

== Coaching staff ==
1940 Pittsburgh Panthers football staff
Coaching staff: Charley Bowser – Head coach; Robert Hoel – Assistant coach; Dr. Arnold Greene – fullback coach; Harold Stebbins – halfback coach; William Daddio – end coach; Nick Kliskey– freshman team coach; Richard Fullerton – assistant freshman team coach; Harold Klein – assistant freshman team coach; John Dickinson – assistant freshman coach	Support staff: Dr. H. A. Ralph Shanor – team physician; Harold Whitson – varsity equipment manager; Howard Waite - football trainer; James Hagan - director of athletics; Frank Carver – publicity director; Henry Korp – varsity student manager; Albert Stamen – junior varsity student manager

== Roster ==
1940 Pittsburgh Panthers football roster
Player	Position	Games	Height	Weight	Class	Prep School	Hometown
John Benz*	tackle	8	6 ft 2 in	200	1941	Peabody H. S.	Pittsburgh, PA
Joseph Adamchic	halfback	0	5 ft 10 in	175	1943	Union City H. S.	Union City, PA
Melvin Andrews	guard	0	6 ft	190	1942	Etna H. S.	Etna, PA
Vincent Antonelli*	guard	7	5 ft 10 in	183	1943	Schenley H. S.	Pittsburgh, PA
George Allshouse	center	4	5 ft 10 in	188	1942	Duquesne H. S.	Duquesne, PA
William Benghouser*	tackle	7	6 ft	200	1942	Central Catholic H. S.	Pittsburgh, PA
Ernest Bonelli*	fullback	8	5 ft 9 in	185	1941	Aspinwall H. S.	Aspinwall, PA
Eli Bornheim	halfback	0	5 ft 10 in	165	1943		Elkins Park, PA
Joseph Connell*	fullback	3	5 ft 11 in	192	1942	Charleroi H. S.	Charleroi, PA
Robert Crissman	tackle	0	6 ft 1	194	1942	Butler H. S.	Butler, PA
William Dutton	halfback	5	5 ft 10 in	170	1943	Weston H. S.	Weston, WV
Dwight Emerick	guard	0	5 ft 9 in	180	1943	Aspinwall H. S.	Aspinwall, PA
Ralph Fife*	guard	8	5 ft 11 in	185	1942	Canton McKinley H. S.	Canton, OH
William Fitchko	end	2	6 ft	180	1942	Gary H. S.	Filbert, WV
Paul Foley	guard	2	5 ft 10 in	185	1941	Swissvale H. S.	Swissvale, PA
Allen Gartner	tackle	0	6 ft 1 in	210	1942	Carrick H. S.	Pittsburgh, PA
John Gates*	guard	3	5 ft 10 in	200	1942		Pittsburgh, PA
Stanley Gervelis*	end	8	6 ft 1 in	190	1942	Charleroi H. S.	Charleroi, PA
Jack Goodridge*	end	8	5 ft 11 in	175	1941	Washington H. S.	Washington, PA
Rudolph Gradisek*	guard	8	5 ft 11 in	193	1941	Sewickley Township H. S.	Herminie, PA
Albert Gurczenski*	tackle	6	6 ft 1 in	195	1941	Jeannette H. S.	Jeannette, PA
Ralph Hammond	quarterback	1	5 ft 11 in	180	1943	Wilkinsburg H. S.	Wilkinsburg, PA
Harris Hawkins*	guard	2	5 ft 10 in	166	1941	New Martinsville H. S.	New Martinsville, WV
Jack Heister	center	0	6 ft 2 in	185	1943	Aspinwall H. S.	Aspinwall, PA
Harold Hinte	end	1	5 ft 11 in	185	1943	Mt. Hope H. S.	Sun, WV
Edgar Jones*	halfback	8	5 ft 10 in	175	1942	Scranton H. S.	Scranton, PA
Bud Kincaid	guard	0	5 ft 10 in	185	1942	Peru H. S.	Peru, IN
Harry Kindelberger*	tackle	6	6 ft 3 in	295	1942	Oil City H. S.	Oil City, PA
Lawrence Klotz	end	0	5 ft 11 in	196	1940		Pittsburgh, PA
Ted Konetsky*	tackle	8	6 ft 1 in	195	1941	German Township H. S.	McClelland, PA
George Kracum*	halfback	8	6 ft 1 in	191	1941	Hazelton H. S.	Hazleton, PA
Albert Kunkel	center	4	6 ft 1 in	190	1942		Pittsburgh, PA
William Lohmeyer	end	0	6 ft 4 in	198	1943		Pittsburgh, PA
Robert Malloy	fullback	1	5 ft 10 in	178	1943	Oakmont H. S.	Oakmont, PA
Mario Martorelli	guard	0	6 ft	190	1943		Pittsburgh, PA
George Mitchell*	guard	6	6 ft	190	1942	Ellsworth-Cokeburg H. S.	Ellsworth, PA
Thomas Murphy*	quarterback	5	5 ft 11 in	175	1942		Pittsburgh. PA
Earl Pressel	end	2	6 ft	180	1941	Hollidaysburg H. S.	Hollidaysburg, PA
Raymond Rabinek	quarterback	0	5 ft 10 in	180	1942		Pittsburgh, PA
Joseph Rettinger*	end	3	5 ft 11 in	180	1941	Ashland H. S.	Ashland, PA
John Ross*	fullback	5	5 ft 10 in	184	1942	Ellsworth-Cokeburg H. S.	Ellsworth, PA
Frank Saksa	halfback	4	5 ft 11 in	180	1943	Braddock H. S.	Braddock, PA
Albert Samson	guard	0	5 ft 10 in	175	1942		Pittsburgh, PA
Carl Sardi	end	0	5 ft 10 in	170	1941	Clarion H. S.	Clarion, PA
Michael Sekela*	quarterback	8	6 ft	200	1941	Windber H. S.	Windber, PA
Stephen Sinco*	center	8	5 ft 11 in	205	1942	Canonsburg H. S.	Canonsburg, PA
Louis Sleber	halfback	1	5 ft 9 in	170	1941	Sewickley Township H. S.	Herminie, PA
John Stahl	end	4	5 ft 10 in	185	1942	Tarentum H. S.	Tarentum, PA
Jack Stetler*	halfback	8	5 ft 10 in	168	1941	Glenshaw H. S.	Glenshaw, PA
Robert Stodgell	guard	0	5 ft 11 in	185	1942	Peru H. S.	Peru, IN
Robert Thurbon*	halfback	8	5 ft 10 in	170	1941	Erie H. S.	Erie, PA
Joseph Walker	fullback	0	5 ft 10 in	172	1943		Pittsburgh, PA
Walter Ward	tackle	2	5 ft 10 in	180	1943		Pittsburgh, PA
Walter West*	quarterback	5	6 ft	185	1943	Atlasburg H. S.	Atlasburg, PA
William Wilson	end	0	6 ft	190	1942	Canonsburg H. S.	Muse, PA
Henry Korp*	varsity student manager				1941		Pittsburgh, PA
* Letterman

== Game summaries ==
=== At Ohio State ===
Week 1: Pitt at Ohio State

Team	1	2	3	4	Total
Pitt	0	0	7	0	7
• Ohio State	0	3	21	6	30

- Date: September 28, 1940
- Location: Ohio Stadium
  Columbus, OH
- Game start: 2:00 p.m.
- Game attendance: 52,877
- Game weather: warm and sunny
- Referee: Frank Birch (Earlham)

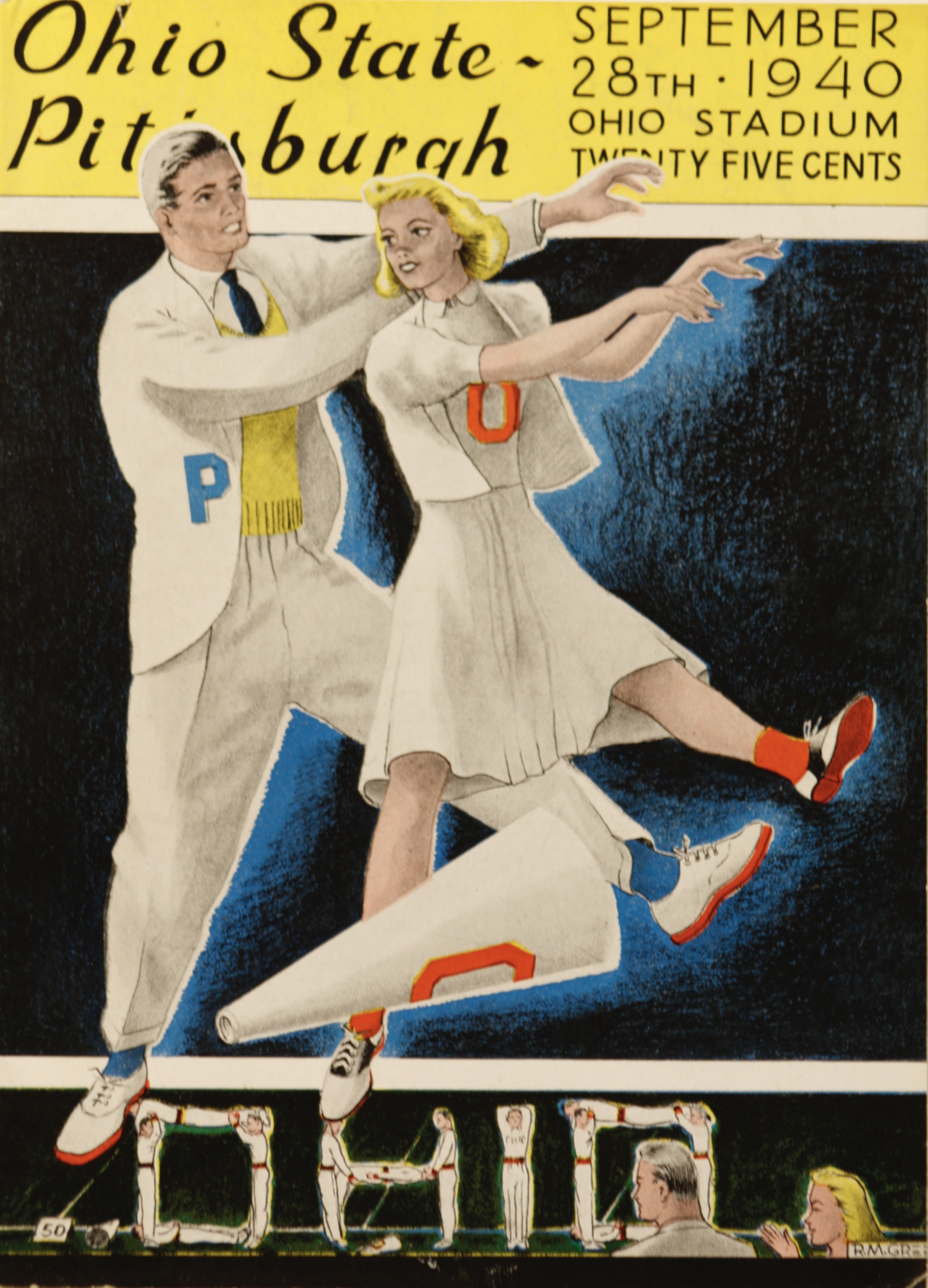
Program for September 28 game versus Ohio State

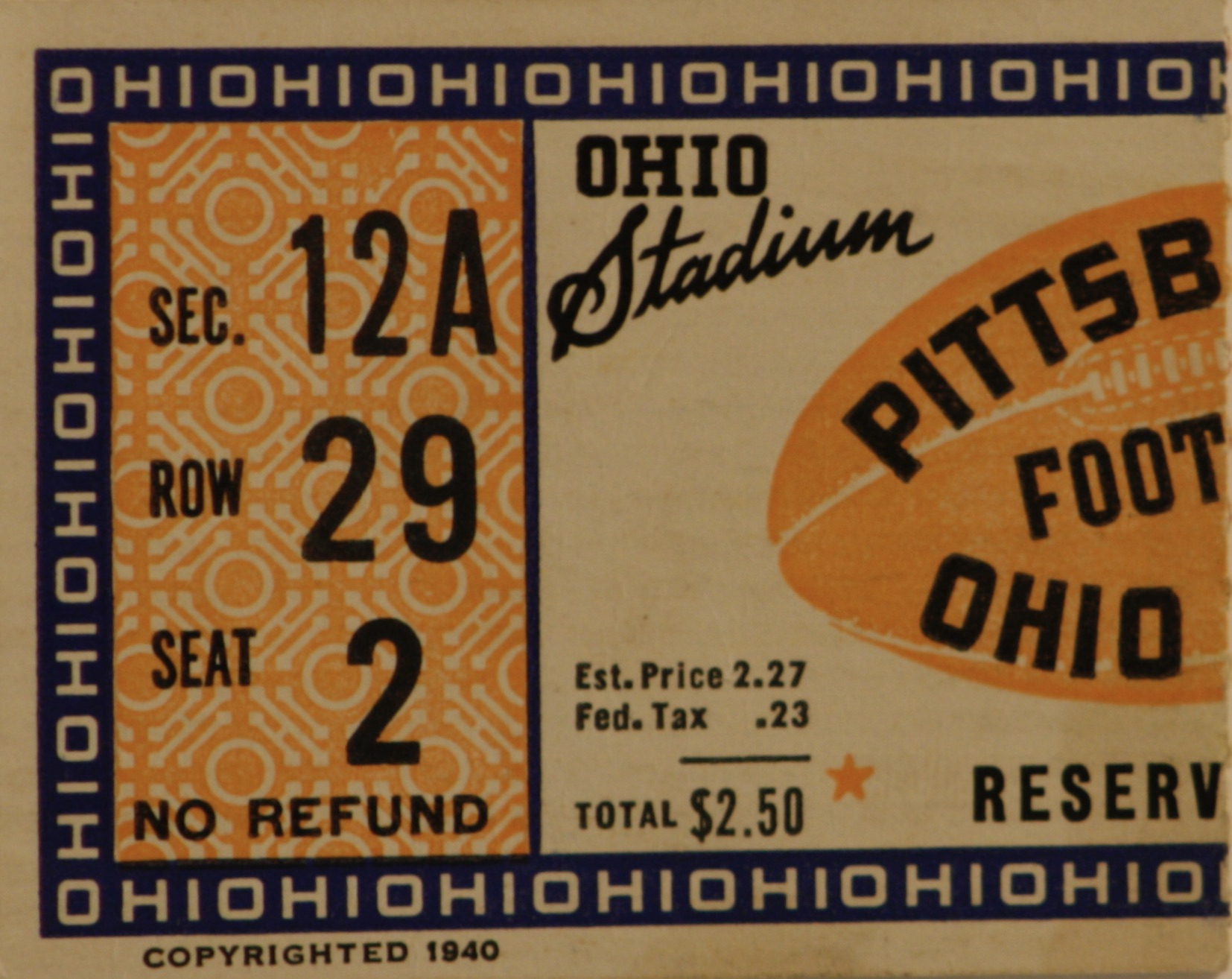
Ticket stub for September 28 game versus Ohio State

The Panthers opened the 1940 season against the defending Big Ten (Western) Conference champion Ohio State Buckeyes in Columbus. This was coach Francis Schmidt's seventh and final season as leader of the Buckeyes. OSU's lineup had 10 returning lettermen, featuring All-American quarterback Don Scott. Even though Ohio State trailed 1–2–1 in the all-time series, they were 5 to 1 favorites and had not lost an opening game since 1894.

The outmanned Panthers succumbed to the Ohio State Buckeyes 30 to 7. The Panthers held the Buckeyes to a first half 25-yard field goal by Charles Maag. Early in the third period Maag blocked Edgar Jones' quick kick and recovered on the Pitt 4-yard line. On first down James Langhurst scored the touchdown. Don Scott booted the extra point to make the score 10–0. The Pitt offense answered with a 12-play, 65-yard scoring drive. George Kracum carried the ball six times for 43 yards and James Thurbon carried four times. Thurbon scored through the middle from the one. Mike Sekela added the extra point and Pitt trailed 10 to 7. The Ohio State aerial offense added two more touchdowns in the third period. Don Scott threw a 45-yard touchdown pass to Langhurst and an 18-yard touchdown pass to Charles Anderson. Scott and Jack Graf added the extra points and Ohio led 24–7. The Buckeye second string scored in the fourth quarter on an 8-yard touchdown pass from James Sexton to Sam Fox. Graf missed the placement. Final score: Ohio State 30 to Pittsburgh 7.

Statistics were deceiving as the Panthers earned 16 first downs to 8 for the Buckeyes and Pitt out-rushed the Buckeyes 217 yards to 191. Ohio State won the passing game 91 yards to 21.

Ohio State finished the season with a 4–4 record.

The Pitt starting lineup for the game against Ohio State was Stanley Gervelis (left end), Ted Konetsky (left tackle), Rudy Gradisek (left guard), Stephen Sinco (center), Ralph Fife (right guard), John Benz (right tackle), Joe Rettinger (right end), Mike Sekela (quarterback), Edgar Jones (left halfback), Robert Thurbon (right halfback) and George Kracum (fullback). Substitutes appearing in the game for Pitt were Jack Goodridge, John Stahl, William Benghouser, Harry Kindelberger, Vincent Antonelli, Harris Hawkins, John Gates, Albert Kunkel, Robert Malloy, Jack Stetler, Ernest Bonelli, William Dutton, John Ross, Frank Saksa, Thomas Murphy and Walter West.

Scoring summary

Quarter	Time	Drive			Team	Scoring information	Score	
Quarter	Time	Plays	Yards	TOP	Team	Scoring information	Pittsburgh	Ohio State
2		10	59		Ohio State	25-yard field goal by Charles Maag	0	3
3		1	4		Ohio State	James Langhurst 4-yard touchdown run, David Scott kick good	0	10
3		15	65		Pittsburgh	Robert Thurbon 1-yard touchdown run, Mike Sekela kick good	7	10
3		3	71		Ohio State	James Langhurst 45-yard touchdown reception from David Scott, David Scott kick good	7	17
3		6	36		Ohio State	Charles Anderson 18-yard touchdown reception from David Scott, Jack Graf kick good	7	24
4		7	54		Ohio State	Sam Fox 8-yard touchdown reception from James Sexton, Jack Graf kick no good	7	30
"TOP" = time of possession. For other American football terms, see Glossary of American football.							7	30

=== Missouri ===
Week 2: Missouri at Pitt

Team	1	2	3	4	Total
Missouri	0	6	0	7	13
• Pitt	7	0	6	6	19

- Date: October 5, 1940
- Location: Pitt Stadium
  Pittsburgh, PA
- Game start: 2:00 p.m.
- Game attendance: 26,000
- Game weather: cloudy and warm
- Referee: W. T. Halloran (Providence)

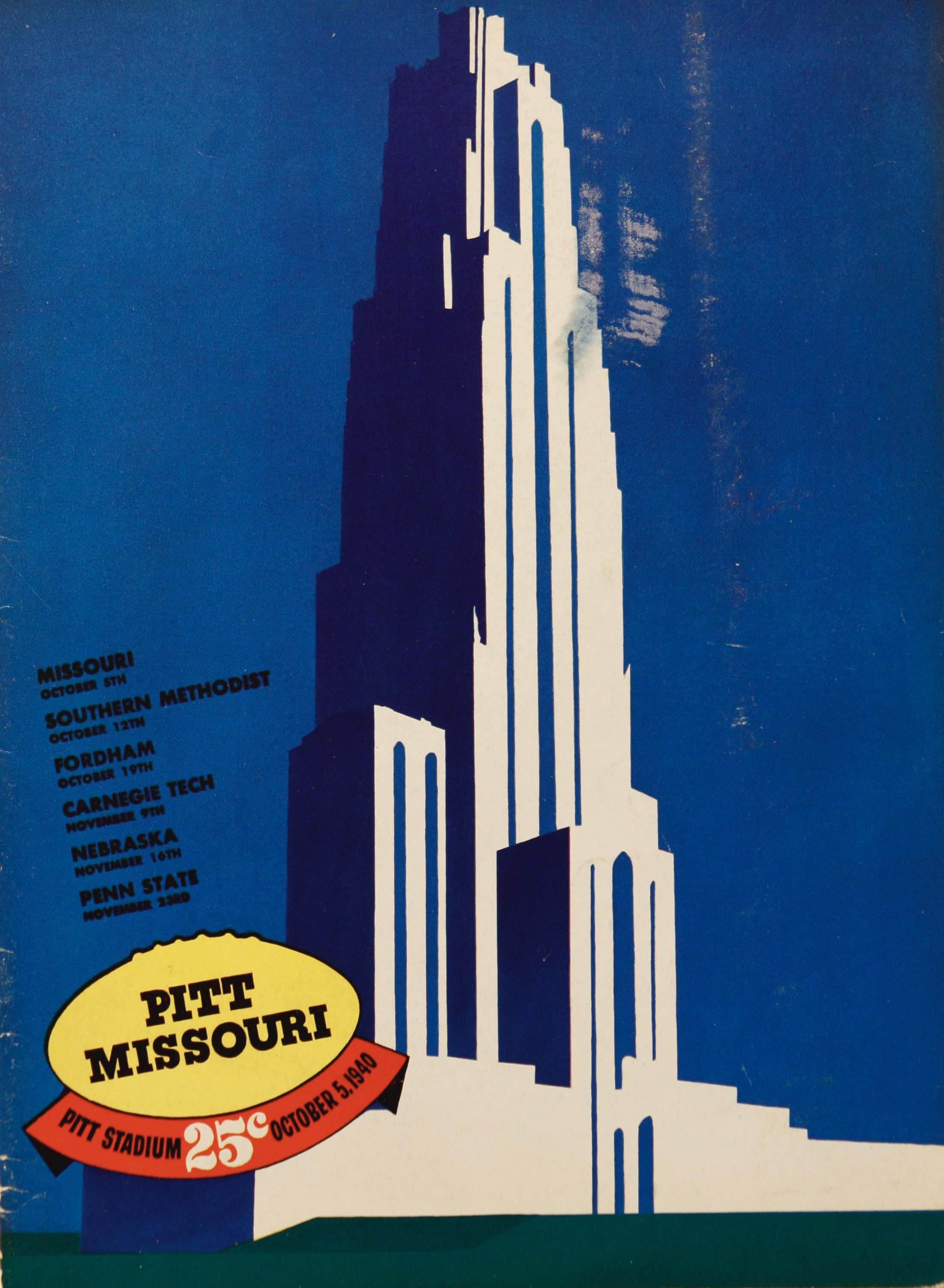
Program for October 5 game versus Missouri

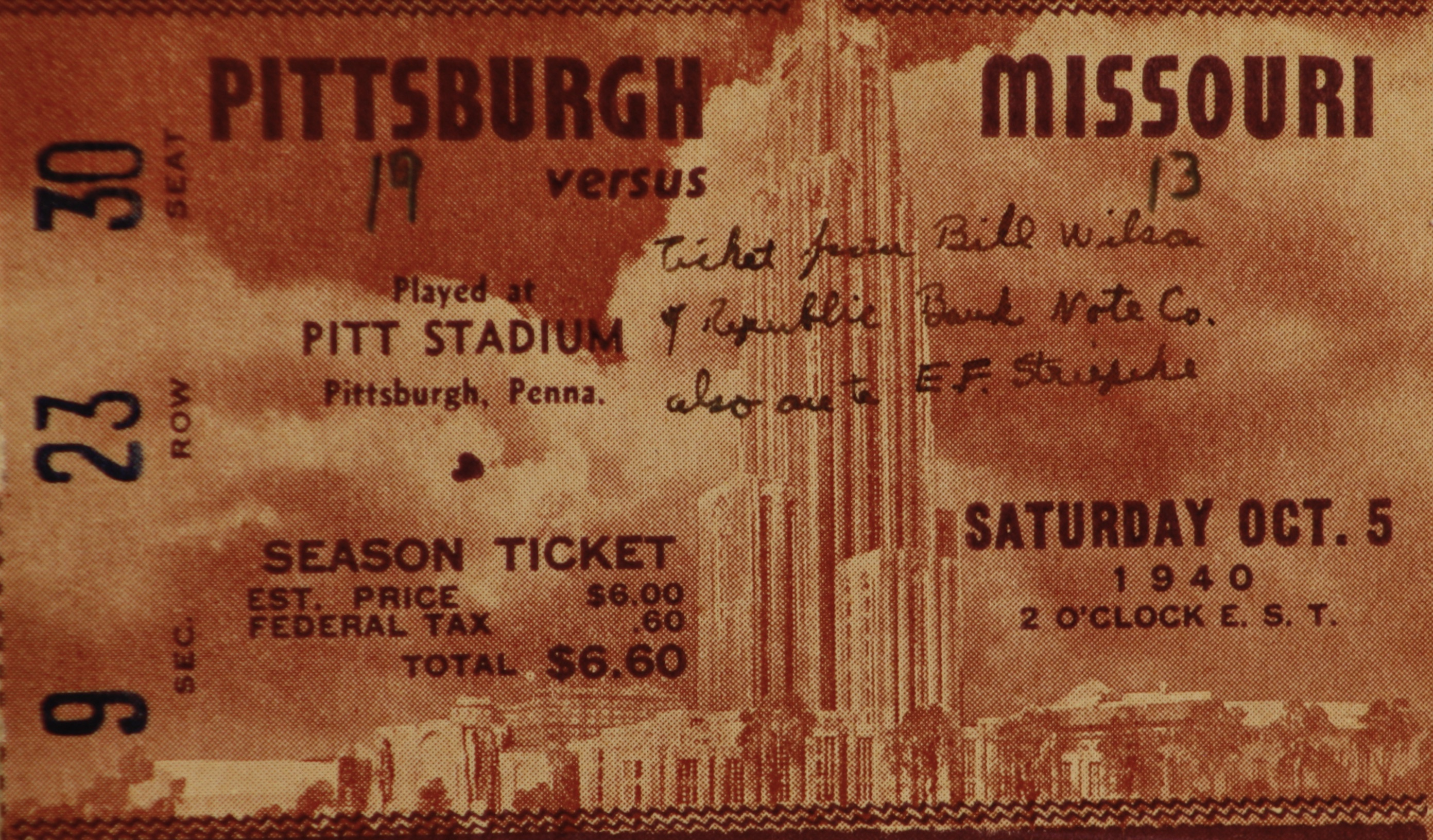
Ticket stub for October 5 game versus Missouri

For the home opener, the Panthers welcomed the defending Big Six Conference Champion Missouri Tigers. Sixth-year coach Don Faurot led the 1939 Tigers to an 8–2 record and sixth place ranking in the Associated Press final poll. This season they opened with a 40–26 victory over the St. Louis Billikens. The Tigers were led by All-American and future College Football Hall of Famer, quarterback Paul Christman.

Tom Hopkins of the Sun-Telegraph wrote: “Coach Bowser has decided to give the 11 starters another chance to prove their right to first-team ranking but this will be the last chance. If the Panthers don't show improvement against Missouri there will be wholesale revision of the lineup for the Southern Methodist game...”

The Panther offensive ground game out-performed the Missouri passing game by the score of 19 to 13. Pitt scored in the first period. The Panthers recovered a Tiger fumble on the Missouri 49-yard line. Twelve plays later fullback George Kracum bulled into the end zone from the 2-yard line. Missouri blocked Mike Sekela's placement attempt, but Rudy Gradisek recovered the ball and lateraled to Edgar Jones who carried it across the goal for the extra point. In the second quarter the Tigers responded with a 55-yard, 7-play drive. A pass interference penalty kept the drive alive before Bill Cunningham rushed the final five yards for the score. Robert Steuber's placement attempt was wide, but the Panthers were offside. Cunningham was unsuccessful on the second attempt and Pitt led 7 to 6 at halftime. Pitt got the ball to start the third quarter and marched 80-yards on 15 running plays. Edgar Jones carried the ball into the end zone from the 12-yard line. Sekela's placement went wide and Pitt led 13 to 6. Late in the third period, the Panthers intercepted a Paul Christman pass to gain possession on their own 38-yard line. On the seventeenth play, Ernest Bonelli scored on a 1-yard plunge and Sekela missed the point after. Pitt 19 to Missouri 6. The Tigers answered with an 88-yard, 11-play drive to cut the lead to 19 to 13. Missouri recovered an onside kick on the Pitt 44-yard line with 50 seconds remaining in the game. Christman completed a pass to Jack Lister for a first down on the Panther 31-yard line. The Panther defense sacked Christman on third down to secure the win.

Coach Faurot told the Sun-Telegraph: “Pitt has a fine team and deserved to beat us. Our passing attack wasn't quite up to par and I was disappointed in our running attack...” Coach Bowser: “refused to admit press representatives to the Panther dressing room, establishing a precedent in Pitt football history.”

Missouri finished the season in third place in the Big Six Conference with an overall 6–3 record.

The Pitt starting lineup for the game against Missouri was Stanley Gervelis (left end), Ted Konetsky (left tackle), Rudy Gradisek (left guard), Stephen Sinco (center), Ralph Fife (right guard), John Benz (right tackle), Joe Rettinger (right end), Mike Sekela (quarterback), Edgar Jones (left halfback), Robert Thurbon (right halfback) and George Kracum (fullback). Substitutes appearing in the game for Pitt were Jack Goodridge, William Benghouser, Harry Kindelberger, Vincent Antonelli, Harris Hawkins, John Gates, Albert Kunkel, Jack Stetler, Ernest Bonelli, Thomas Murphy, Albert Gurczenski, Earl Pressel, George Mitchell and Joseph Connell.

Scoring summary

Quarter	Time	Drive			Team	Scoring information	Score	
Quarter	Time	Plays	Yards	TOP	Team	Scoring information	Missouri	Pittsburgh
1		12	49		Pittsburgh	George Kracum 2-yard touchdown run, Mike Sekela kick no good (blocked), but Rudy Gradisek recovered the ball and lateraled to Edgar Jones, who ran into the end zone	0	7
2		7	55		Missouri	Bill Cunningham 5-yard touchdown run, Bill Cunningham kick no good (miss short)	6	7
3		15	80		Pittsburgh	Edgar Jones 12-yard touchdown run, Mike Sekela kick no good	6	13
4		17	61		Pittsburgh	Ernest Bonelli 1-yard touchdown run, Mike Sekela kick no good	6	19
4		11	88		Missouri	Paul Christman 1-yard touchdown run, Robert Steuber kick good	13	19
"TOP" = time of possession. For other American football terms, see Glossary of American football.							13	19

=== SMU ===
Week 3: SMU at Pitt

Team	1	2	3	4	Total
SMU	0	0	0	7	7
Pitt	0	7	0	0	7

- Date: October 12, 1940
- Location: Pitt Stadium
  Pittsburgh, PA
- Game start: 2:00 p.m.
- Game attendance: 39,000
- Game weather: warm and sunny
- Referee: H. O. Dayoff (Bucknell)

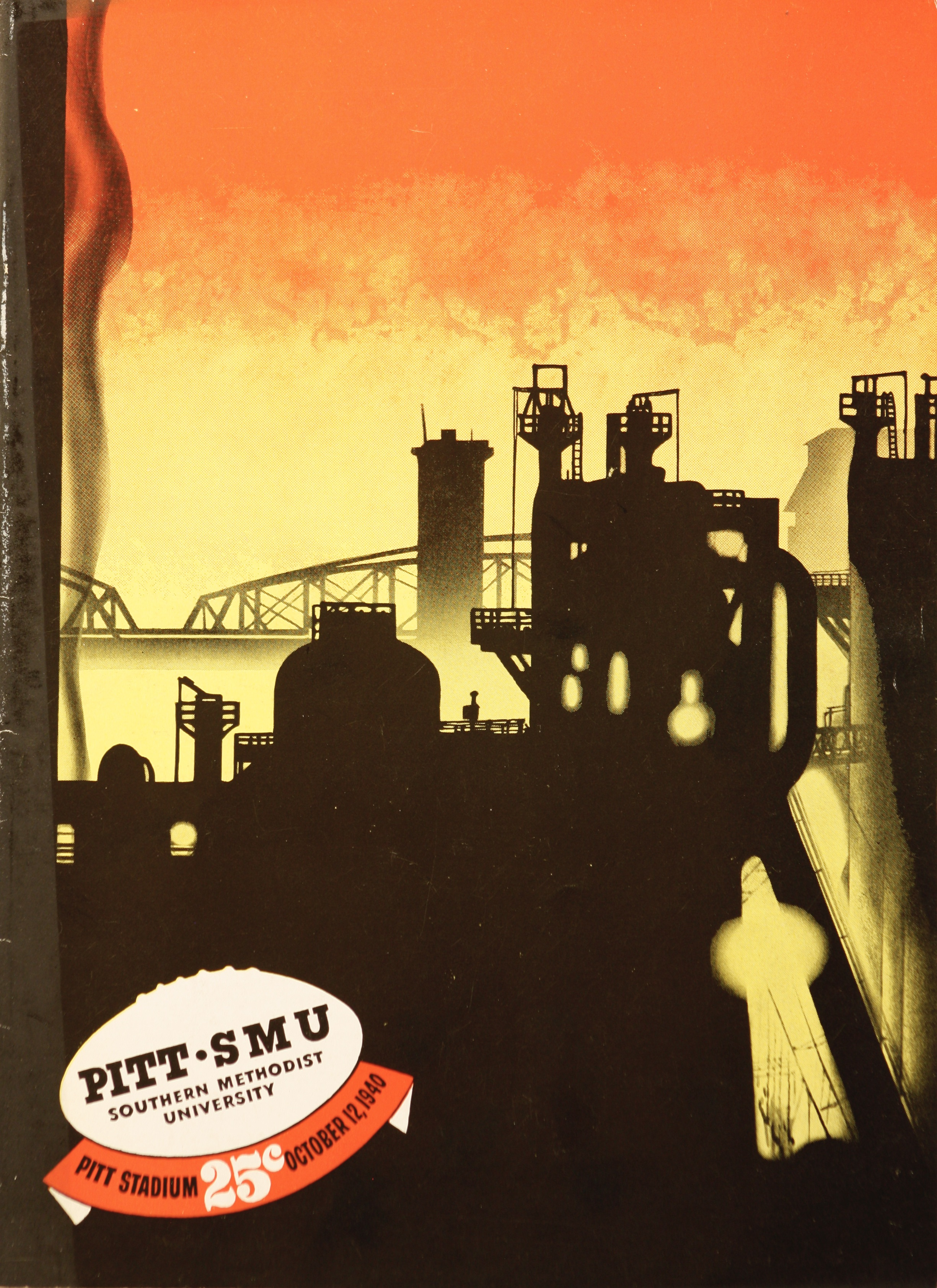
Program for October 12 game versus SMU

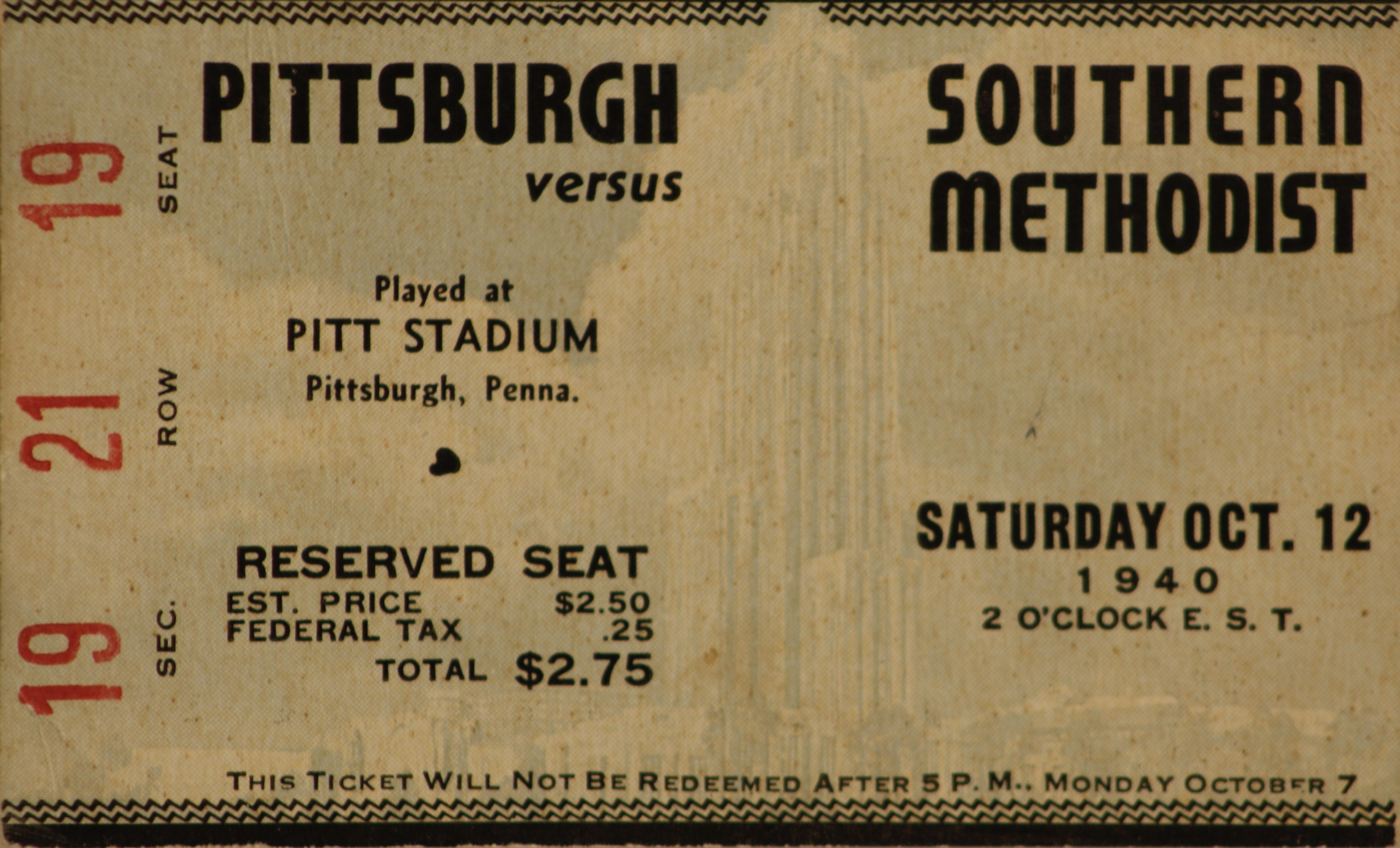
Ticket stub for October 12 game versus SMU

Game three on the schedule pitted the Pitt Panthers against the Southern Methodist Mustangs. Pitt led the series 1–0, having beaten the Mustangs 34 to 7 in their 1938 meeting.

Sixth-year coach Madison Bell led the Mustangs to a third place finish in the Southwest Conference in 1939. They opened this season with victories over UCLA and North Texas. Coach Bell's squad was a veteran team, having only lost 8 lettermen to graduation. The Mustangs were favored, but Bell was cautious when discussing the game: "I can't tell much about this team yet...We have no outstanding players such as we boasted in 1935 and it seems to be more of a team unit than any I've coached in the past few seasons." Three Mustangs missed the train in Dallas and tried to drive to the next station by car to catch up. They had an accident and starting halfback Foster Elder was hospitalized with a fractured pelvis and hip injuries. Bill Thomas and Red McLan were able to fly to Indianapolis and join the team.

After the SMU swing band performed to the delight of the crowd in 1938, Chester L. Smith of The Pittsburgh Press noted that "more folks called up to inquire if Southern Methodist was bringing along its swing band than to ask if the football team was making the trip."

In front of 39,000 fans, the underdog Panthers and Mustangs fought to a 7–7 tie. Pitt was the better team statistically: the Panthers earned 16 first downs to 5; gained 188 rushing yards to 51; gained 103 passing yards to 77; intercepted 2 passes and recovered 3 Mustang fumbles. The Panthers had three drives deep into SMU territory in the opening quarter, but lost the ball on downs each time. Late in the second period, SMU fullback Clint McClain fumbled and Pitt tackle Rudy Gradisek recovered on the Mustang 31-yard line. On two carries James Thurbon advanced the ball to the 16-yard line. Edgar Jones threw two incompletions before connecting with John Goodridge on the 1-yard line. Pitt was penalized 5 yards for excessive time outs. With 15 seconds left on the clock, Jones threw a 6-yard touchdown pass to Thurbon in the corner of the end zone. Mike Sekela booted the point after and Pitt led 7 to 0 at halftime. In the second half, the Panther offense advanced the ball to the SMU 30-yard line, but lost the ball on a Bobby Brown interception. The Panther defense held, but the offense gave the ball back on an interception by Raymond Pope, who carried the ball to the Pitt 20-yard line. The Panther defense forced a fumble and end John Goodridge recovered for Pitt on their own 34-yard line. The Panthers were thrown for losses on three straight plays. Thurbon's punt went out of bounds on the Panther 41-yard line. SMU back Ray Mallouf's pass to Bob Baccus gained 8 yards. Fullback McClain was stopped for no gain. Mallouf hit Billy Thomas with a 33-yard scoring pass on third down. Thomas was good on the placement and the game was tied. The Panthers advanced the ball into SMU territory and punted out of bounds on the Mustang 6-yard line. The Mustangs lined up in punt formation and Preston Johnston "flipped the field" with a 92-yard punt from scrimmage. The Panthers later needed a George Kracum interception to insure the tie.

The SMU Mustangs finished the season tied for first-place in the Southwest Conference with an 8–1–1 record. They were ranked number 16 in the final Associated Press football poll.

Two Panthers suffered season-ending injures. End Joe Rettinger broke his leg and back-up guard John Gates tore a ligament in his leg.

The Pitt starting lineup for the game against SMU was Stanley Gervelis (left end), Ted Konetsky (left tackle), Rudy Gradisek (left guard), Stephen Sinco (center), Ralph Fife (right guard), John Benz (right tackle), Joe Rettinger (right end), Mike Sekela (quarterback), Edgar Jones (left halfback), Robert Thurbon (right halfback) and George Kracum (fullback). Substitutes appearing in the game for Pitt were Jack Goodridge, William Benghouser, Harry Kindelberger, Vincent Antonelli, John Gates, Albert Kunkel, Jack Stetler, Ernest Bonelli, Frank Saksa, Thomas Murphy, Albert Gurczenski, George Mitchell and Joseph Connell.

Scoring summary

Quarter	Time	Drive			Team	Scoring information	Score	
Quarter	Time	Plays	Yards	TOP	Team	Scoring information	SMU	Pittsburgh
2		6	31		Pittsburgh	Robert Thurbon 6-yard touchdown reception from Edgar Jones, Mike Sekela kick good	0	7
4		3	41		SMU	Billy Thomas 34-yard touchdown reception from Ray Mallouf, Billy Thomas kick good	7	7
"TOP" = time of possession. For other American football terms, see Glossary of American football.							7	7

=== Fordham ===
Week 4: Fordham at Pitt

Team	1	2	3	4	Total
• Fordham	6	18	0	0	24
Pitt	6	0	6	0	12

- Date: October 19, 1940
- Location: Pitt Stadium
  Pittsburgh, PA
- Game start: 2:00 p.m.
- Game attendance: 40,000
- Game weather: snow
- Referee: E. A. Geiges (Temple)

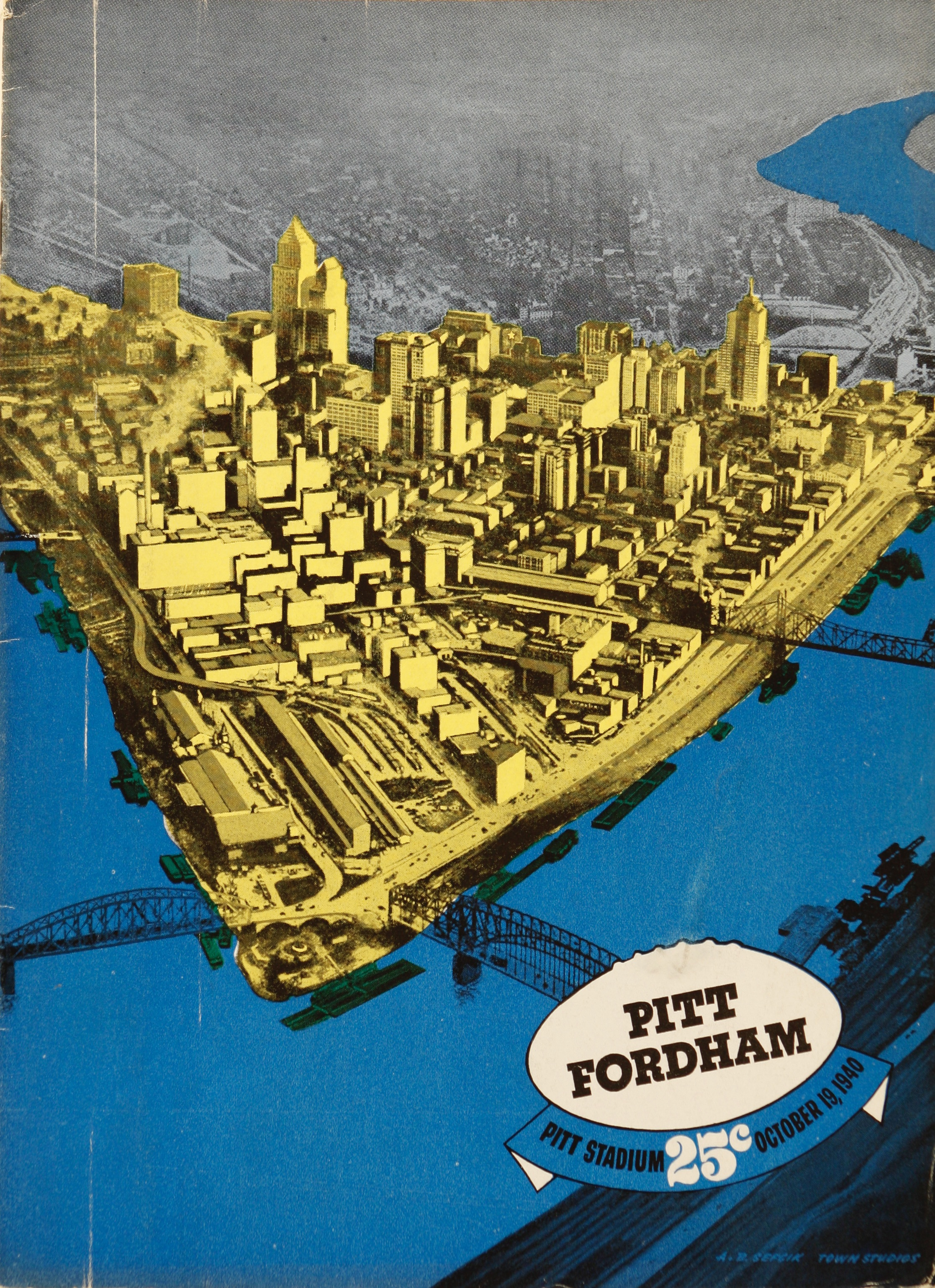
Program for October 19 game versus Fordham

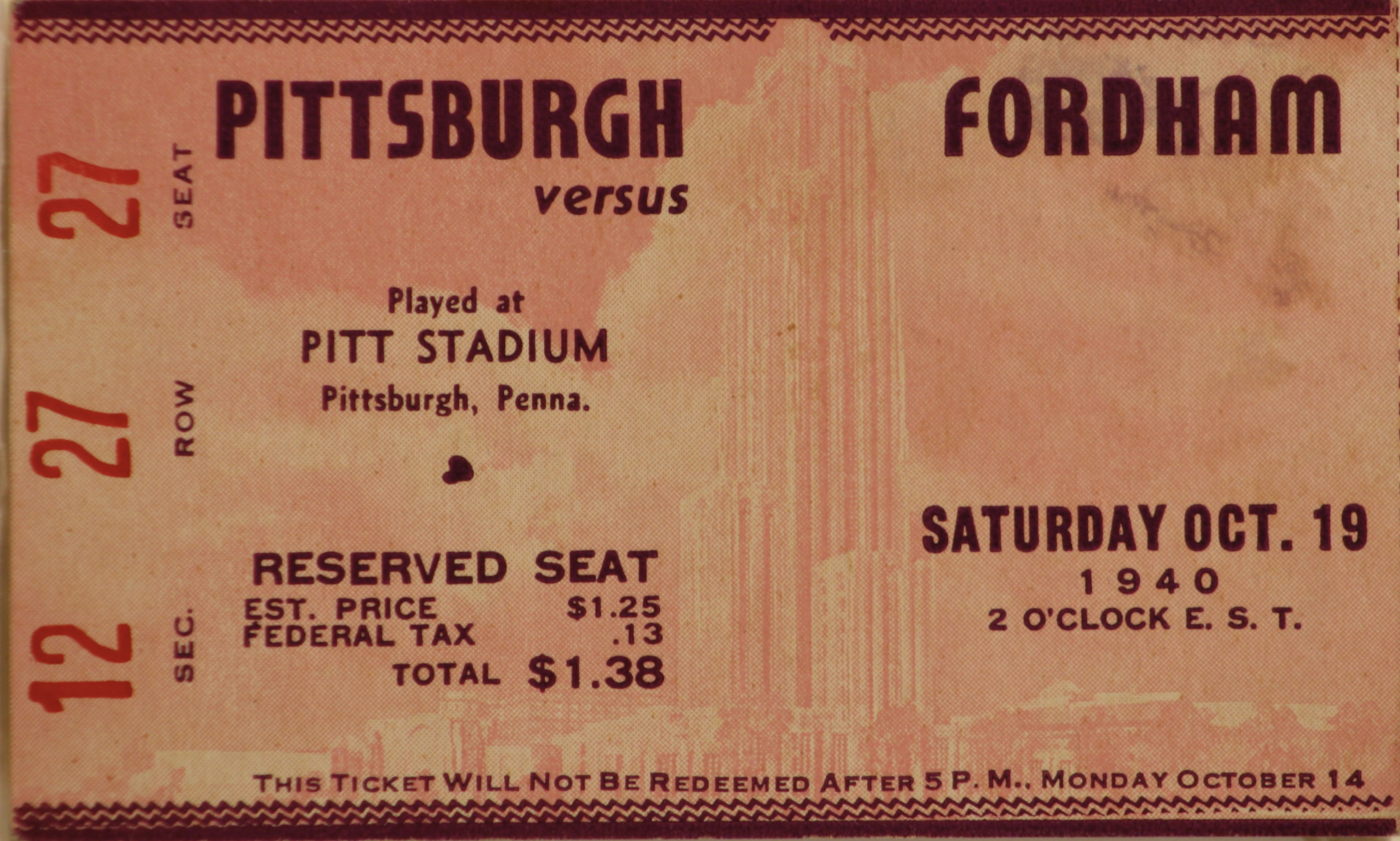
Ticket stub for October 19 game versus Fordham

On October 19, Jimmy Crowley's Fordham Rams played the Panthers for the sixth time. The series was tied at 1–1–3, each team having won a game after playing three scoreless ties in a row. The Rams opened this season by beating West Virginia and Tulane by identical 20 to 7 scores. Fordham with All-America picks tackle Joe Ungerer, fullback Steve Filipowicz and end Jim Lansing, along with star backs Len Eshmont and Jim Blumenstock, was a veteran squad that had eight returning starters from the 1939 team that beat Pitt 24–13. Coach Crowley was cautious: "The game that Pitt played against the Mustangs put a different complexion on our impending battle. Apparently, Pitt's offense has been highly underrated and we probably are in for a harder game than any of us anticipated."

On October 15, thousands of eligible men registered for the selective service draft. 600 University of Pittsburgh students were eligible including James Hagan, Pitt Athletic Director, 28 squad members and 8 coaches of the Pitt football team.

This was Pitt's Homecoming and The Pittsburgh Press wrote: "There was to be a batch of added color, with both the Pitt and Fordham bands supplying the musical tempo and a host of celebrities from all fields attending. U. S. Senator Josh Lee, Oklahoma's 'draft-the-wealth' politico; Joe E. Brown, the movie comedian and long-time Pitt rooter; Frankie Frisch, Pirate baseball manager and exFordham (sic) Flash; Charles Laughton, actor, were to attend."

The Fordham Rams ran roughshod over the hapless Panthers 24 to 12. The prevalent color seen by the crowd of 40,00 shivering fans was white, as an early snowstorm covered the field. The Panthers scored first by advancing 65 yards in 5 plays. Edgar Jones raced the final 34 yards for the touchdown. Mike Sekela's placement was blocked. Pitt led 6 to 0. The rest of the first half was all Fordham, as they countered Pitt's drive with 4 touchdown runs. James Blumenstock went 49 yards on a reverse for the first touchdown. Len Eshmont scored the second from the 5-yard line after the Rams recovered a botched Pitt center snap. On the Panthers next possession, Fordham blocked James Thurbon's punt and recovered on the Pitt 3-yard line. Stephen Filipowicz went through left guard for the score. The final Fordham score came after a 33-yard, 4-play drive capped by an Eshmont 13-yard run. Fordham led 24–6 as all extra points failed. The Panthers managed a 5-play, 53-yard drive in the third quarter to trim the lead to 24 to 12, as Jones scored on an 18-yard run around end. Fordham spent the final quarter in Pitt territory but was unable to score.

The Rams finished the regular season with a 7–1 record and were invited to the Cotton Bowl. They lost to Texas A&M 13–12 and ended up ranked number 12 in the final Associated Press football poll.

The Pitt starting lineup for the game against Fordham was Stanley Gervelis (left end), Ted Konetsky (left tackle), Rudy Gradisek (left guard), Stephen Sinco (center), Ralph Fife (right guard), John Benz (right tackle), Jack Goodridge (right end), Mike Sekela (quarterback), Edgar Jones (left halfback), Robert Thurbon (right halfback) and George Kracum (fullback). Substitutes appearing in the game for Pitt were William Benghouser, Vincent Antonelli, Albert Kunkel, Jack Stetler, Ernest Bonelli, William Dutton, Frank Saksa, Albert Gurczenski, George Mitchell and George Allshouse.

Scoring summary

Quarter	Time	Drive			Team	Scoring information	Score	
Quarter	Time	Plays	Yards	TOP	Team	Scoring information	Fordham	Pittsburgh
1		5	65		Pittsburgh	Edgar Jones 34-yard touchdown run, kick no good (blocked)	0	6
1		2	55		Fordham	James Blumenstock 49-yard touchdown run, Stanley Krivik kick no good	6	6
2		1	5		Fordham	Leonard Eshmont 5-yard touchdown run, Stanley Krivik kick good/no good (blocked)/no good (miss right)/no good (miss left)/no good (miss short)/no good	12	6
2		3	3		Fordham	Stephen Filipowicz 3-yard touchdown run, James Noble kick no good	18	6
2		4	33		Fordham	Leonard Eshmont 13-yard touchdown run, Leonard Eshmont (failed run) kick no good	6	24
3		5	53		Pittsburgh	Edgar Jones 18-yard touchdown run, Edgar Jones (failed run) kick no good	12	24
"TOP" = time of possession. For other American football terms, see Glossary of American football.							24	12

=== Carnegie Tech ===
Week 5: Carnegie Tech at Pitt

Team	1	2	3	4	Total
Carnegie Tech	0	0	0	0	0
• Pitt	0	0	6	0	6

- Date: November 9, 1940
- Location: Pitt Stadium
  Pittsburgh, PA
- Game start: 2:00 p.m.
- Game attendance: 26,500
- Game weather: cloudy and warm
- Referee: W. T. Halloran

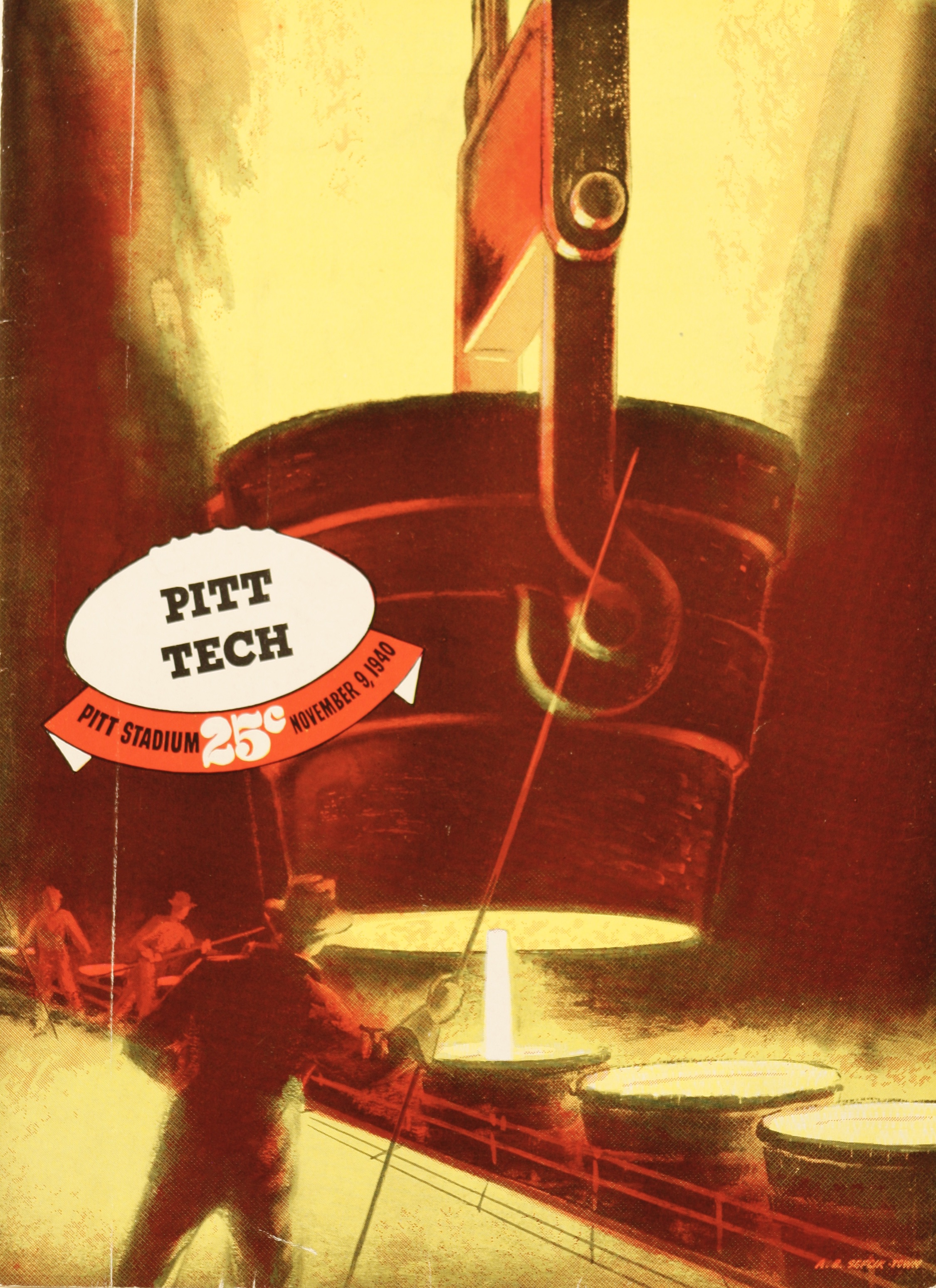
Program for November 9 game versus Carnegie Tech

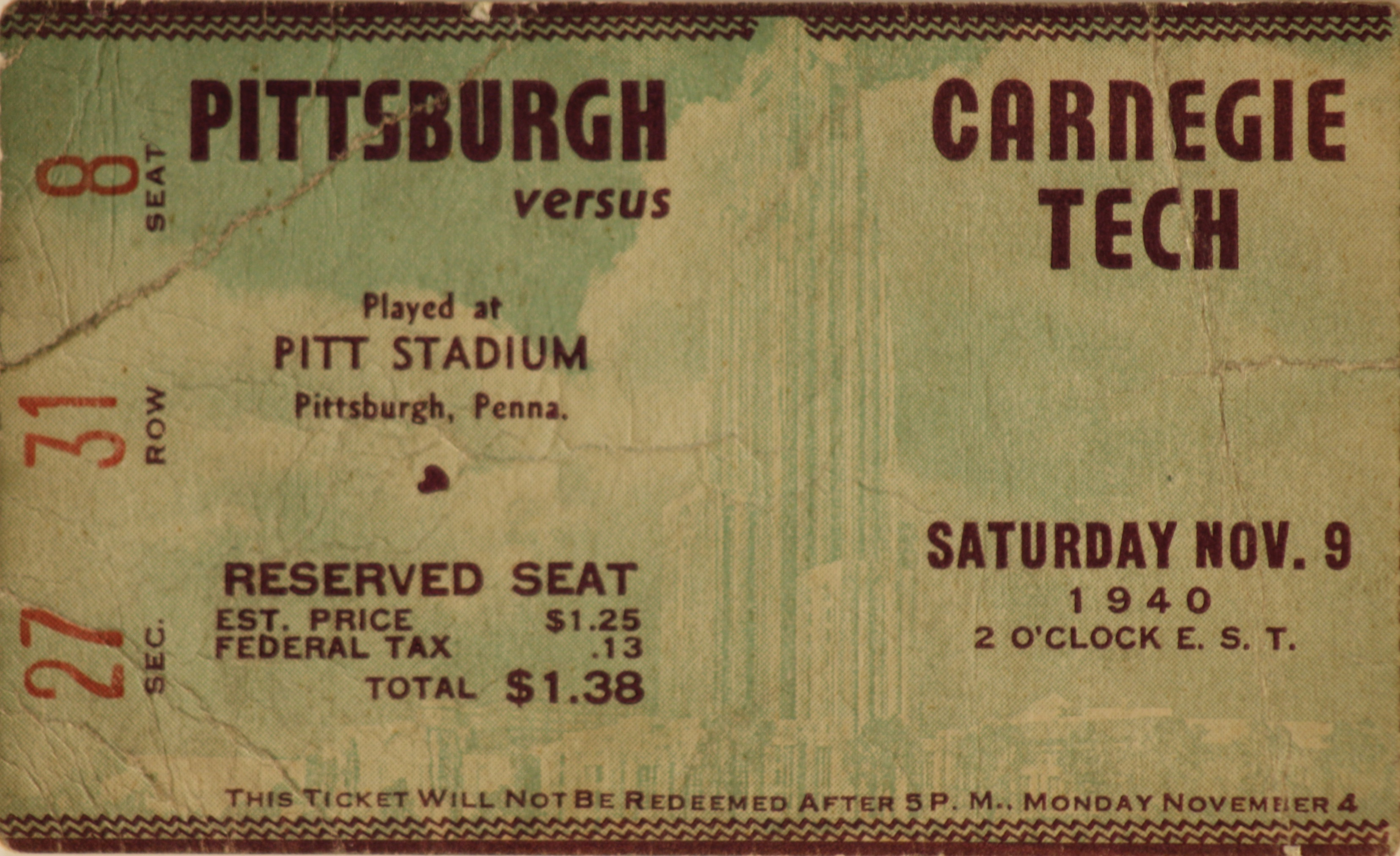
Ticket stub for November 9 game versus Carnegie Tech

The annual “City Game” between the Panthers and their Forbes Street neighbor Carnegie Tech took place on November 9. The Tartans were coached by Eddie Baker, a former Pitt player and assistant coach for 6 years (1931–1936) under Jock Sutherland. They had a 2–3 record, having beaten Geneva (21–0) and Case (14–0), and losing to Holy Cross (18–0), Notre Dame (61–0) and Cincinnati (7–6). Coach Baker told The Press: “I think we're capable of playing much better ball than has showed to date. At full strength, that is, with the few good players we have in top condition. I believe we could give any team in the country a good game if the boys decide to play ball and go the limit.”

The Panthers led the series 20–5–1. Pitt was heavily favored in spite of their 1–1–2 record. "About the only sidelight to the match is the first clash of Charley Bowser and Dr. Eddie Baker of Carnegie Tech as head coaches. It will be the Brentwood dentist's initial attempt as big boss against his Alma Mater as well as against Bowser, a frat brother of Phi Delta Theta."

The Panthers managed to squeak by the Tartans 6–0 to win their 21st game in the series. The Pitt offense earned only 2 first downs in the first half. They did manage to reach the Tech 29-yard line, before losing possession on a John Ross fumble. The Tartans answered with a drive to the Panther 34-yard line, but lost the ball on downs. The Panther offense generated a 14-play, 72-yard scoring drive on their second possession after halftime. The highlight play was a 27-yard run through guard by fullback George Kracum from midfield to the Tech 23-yard line. In the 1939 game Edgar Jones threw a late 39-yard touchdown pass to Bob Thurbon to win the game for the Panthers. This time Jones raced around right end from 8 yards out for a third quarter touchdown that eventually decided the ball game. The Panthers threatened again in the third period, when Jones passed to John Goodridge for a first down on the Carnegie 29-yard line. Tech halfback George Muha intercepted Jones' next pass to halt the drive. Late in the game, Pitt back Ernie Bonelli's punt from the 36-yard line was blocked by Tech center Harold Dunn, who recovered the ball on the Pitt 2-yard line. Four plunges into the line by Muha failed to penetrate the Pitt defensive wall. Pitt punted out of trouble and played sound defense as time expired.

Coach Bowser was relieved: "Whew, I'm just glad we got by this one. That was the greatest goal-line stand I've ever seen. Our team showed the effects of a three-week lay off, particularly in timing. But that doesn't take anything away from the great play of Eddie Baker's Tech team. He really had his boys up for this game."

Carnegie Tech finished the season with a 3–5 record.

The Pitt starting lineup for the game against Carnegie Tech was Stanley Gervelis (left end), Ted Konetsky (left tackle), Rudy Gradisek (left guard), Stephen Sinco (center), Ralph Fife (right guard), John Benz (right tackle), Jack Goodridge (right end), Mike Sekela (quarterback), Edgar Jones (left halfback), Robert Thurbon (right halfback) and George Kracum (fullback). Substitutes appearing in the game for Pitt were John Stahl, William Benghouser, Harry Kindelberger, Vincent Antonelli, Jack Stetler, Ernest Bonelli, William Dutton, John Ross, Frank Saksa, Albert Gurczenski, Earl Pressel, George Mitchell, George Allshouse and Walter West.

Scoring summary

Quarter	Time	Drive			Team	Scoring information	Score	
Quarter	Time	Plays	Yards	TOP	Team	Scoring information	Carnegie Tech	Pittsburgh
3		14	72		Pittsburgh	Edgar Jones 8-yard touchdown run, Mile Sekela kick no good	0	6
"TOP" = time of possession. For other American football terms, see Glossary of American football.							0	6

=== Nebraska ===
Week 6: Nebraska at Pitt

Team	1	2	3	4	Total
• Nebraska	0	6	3	0	9
Pitt	0	7	0	0	7

- Date: November 16, 1940
- Location: Pitt Stadium
  Pittsburgh, PA
- Game start: 2:00 p.m.
- Game attendance: 22,000
- Game weather: frigid
- Referee: E. A. Geiges (Temple)

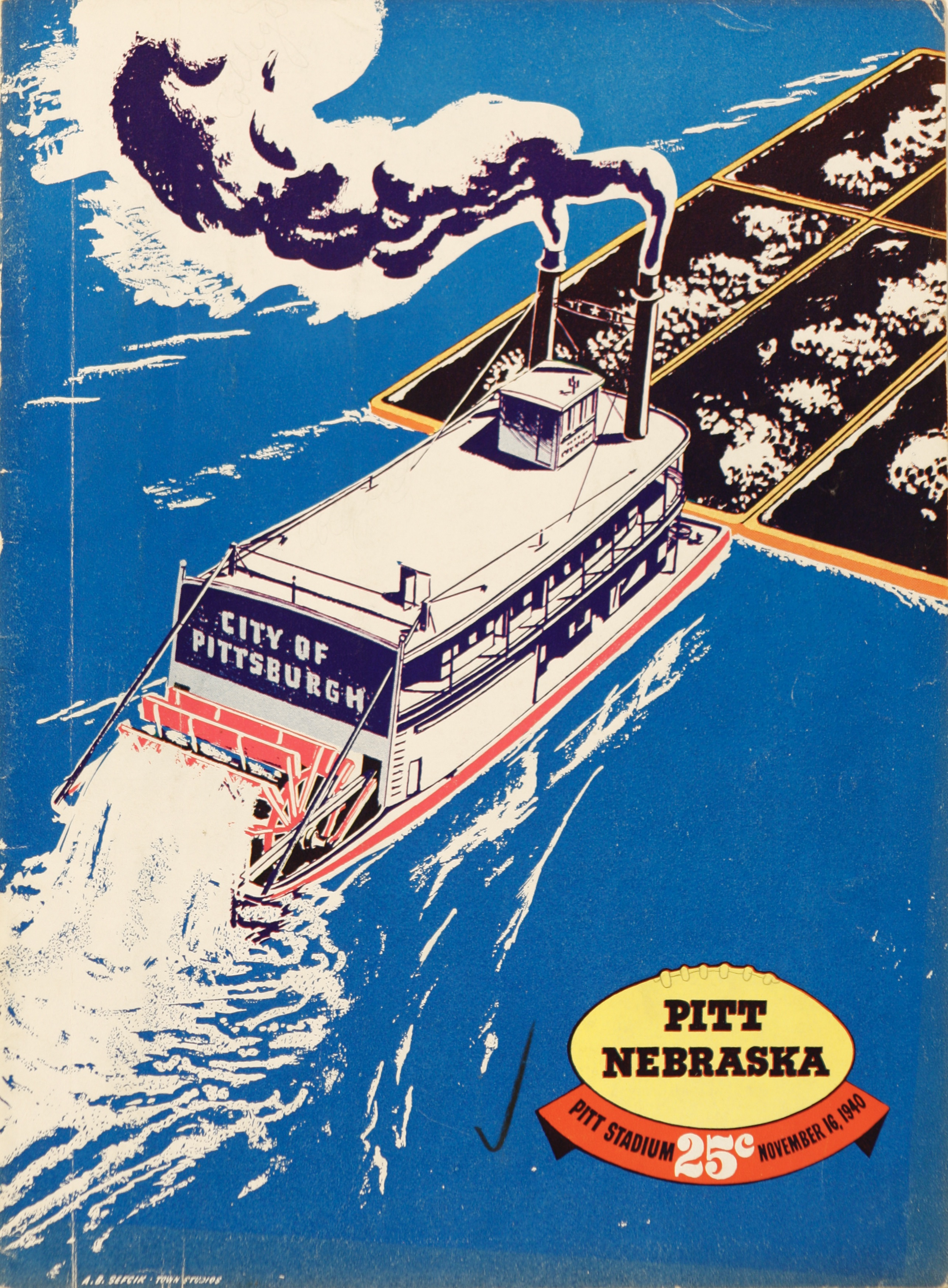
Program for November 16 game versus Nebraska

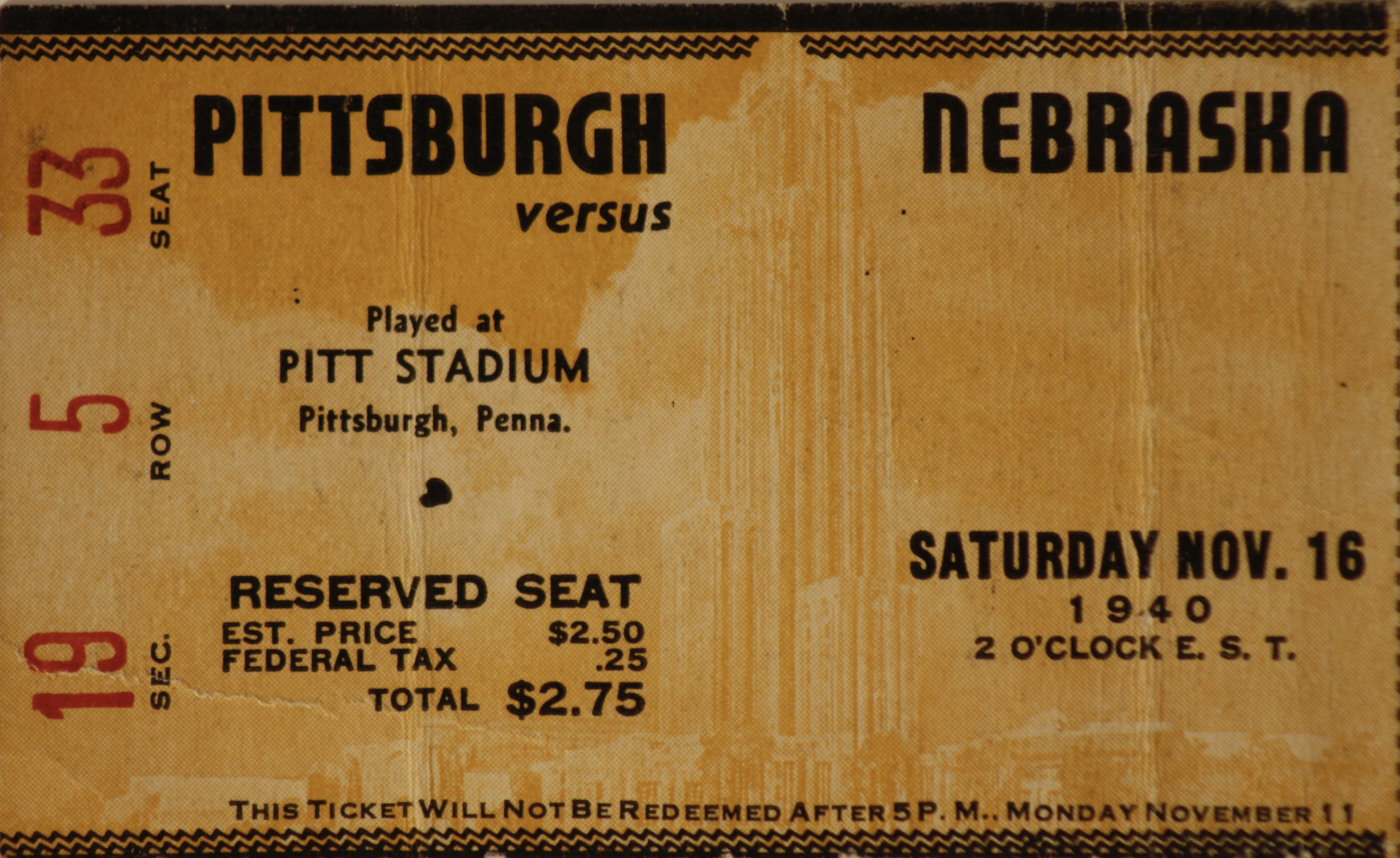
Ticket stub for November 16 game versus Nebraska

On November 16, Biff Jones' Nebraska Cornhuskers beat the Panthers 9–7 for their second win in a row in the series. Nebraska went on to win the Big 6 Conference title with a 5–0 record and earned an invitation to the Rose Bowl, where they would lose to Stanford 21–13. They ended the season with an overall 8–2 record and were ranked #7 in the final Associated Press football poll. Tackle Forrest Behm and guard Warren Alfson received All-America mention.

Late in the first period, the Huskers gained possession on the Panther 49-yard line. They advanced the ball to the 1-yard line as time expired in the quarter. Harry Hopp scored on the next play. Vike Francis' placement attempt was wide and low. Pitt answered with a 4-play, 46-yard touchdown drive. James Thurbon ran the final 6 yards around left end for the touchdown. Mike Sekela added the extra point and Pitt led 7 to 6 at halftime. The final points of the game came after a Panther punt from their own 20-yard line was shanked and went out of bounds on the Panther 22-yard line. Nebraska advanced the ball to the Pitt 4-yard line. The Panther defense held, but Francis booted a 10-yard field goal to put Nebraska back in the lead 9–7. Late in the game, the Panthers gained possession on their own 47-yard line. The Pitt offense ran 14 plays and advanced the ball to the Nebraska 3-yard line. With 40 seconds remaining in the game, Ernest Bonelli lost 2 yards. Pitt was penalized 5 yards for too many timeouts. Substitute end John Stahl's field goal attempt from the 17-yard line “was bad.” Nebraska wins 9–7.

The Pitt starting lineup for the game against Nebraska was Stanley Gervelis (left end), Ted Konetsky (left tackle), Rudy Gradisek (left guard), Stephen Sinco (center), Ralph Fife (right guard), John Benz (right tackle), Jack Goodridge (right end), Mike Sekela (quarterback), Edgar Jones (left halfback), Robert Thurbon (right halfback) and George Kracum (fullback). Substitutes appearing in the game for Pitt were John Stahl, Jack Stetler, Ernest Bonelli, Thomas Murphy and Walter West.

Scoring summary

Quarter	Time	Drive			Team	Scoring information	Score	
Quarter	Time	Plays	Yards	TOP	Team	Scoring information	Nebraska	Pittsburgh
2		8	40		Nebraska	Harry Hopp 1-yard touchdown run, Vike Francis kick no good	6	0
2		4	47		Pittsburgh	James Thurbon 6-yard touchdown run, Mike Sekela kick good	6	7
3		5	18		Nebraska	13-yard field goal by Vike Francis	9	7
"TOP" = time of possession. For other American football terms, see Glossary of American football.							9	7

=== Penn State ===
Week 7: Penn State at Pitt

Team	1	2	3	4	Total
Penn State	0	0	0	7	7
• Pitt	6	0	7	7	20

- Date: November 16, 1940
- Location: Pitt Stadium
  Pittsburgh, PA
- Game start: 2:00 p.m.
- Game attendance: 30,083
- Referee: W. D. Maginnes (Lehigh)

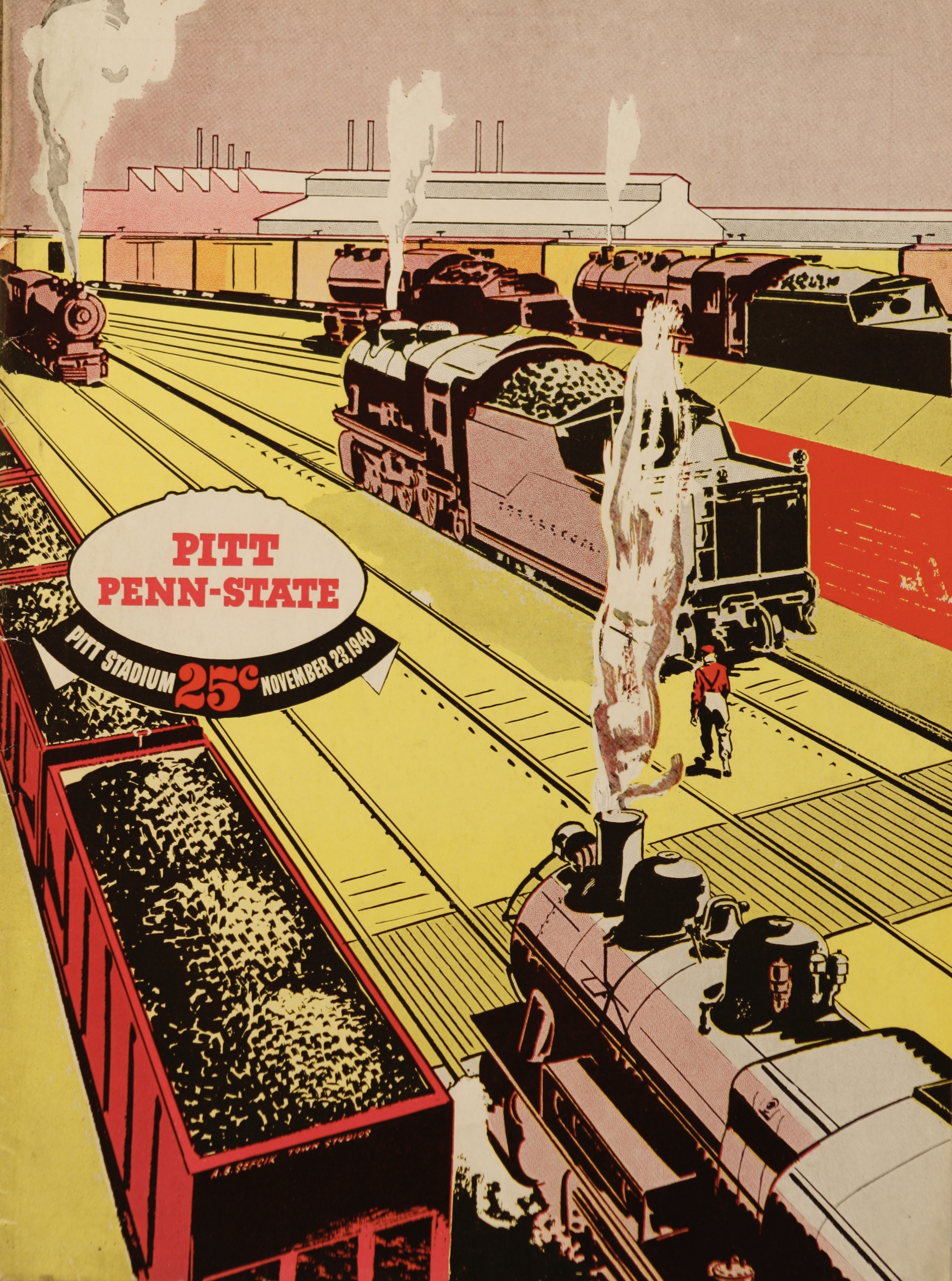
Program for November 23 game versus Penn State

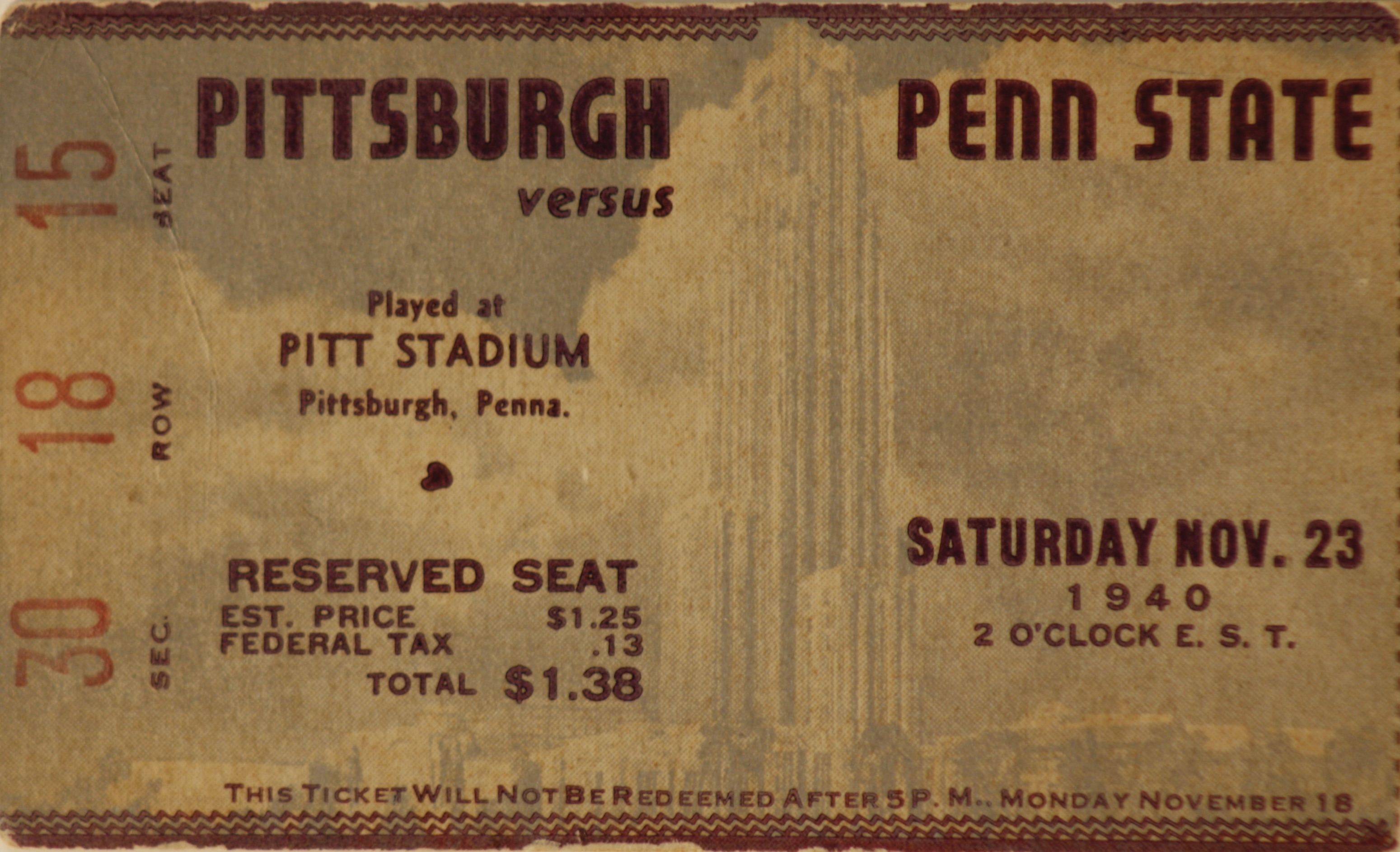
Ticket stub for November 23 game versus Penn State

On November 16, the #20 ranked and undefeated Penn State Nittany Lions, hoping to clinch a bowl invitation, arrived in Pittsburgh with a 6–0–1 record. A 13–13 tie at Syracuse was the only blemish on their record. The Panthers led the series 23–14–2, but State won 10–0 last year after a 20-year winless stretch. The Lions were healthy, plus the State line, nicknamed the “Seven Mountains,” was anchored by All-American center Leon Gajecki. Penn State was favored 3–2 over the Panthers, but State coach Bob Higgins was worried: "I don't know whether we have a really good team or not. We haven't played anyone with a lot of power yet. This game will be our toughest. It will tell whether we are good or just mediocre. Pitt was plenty good last week from the reports I got and I just hope they've lost some of that speed and power."

Pitt quarterback Mike Sekela and running back James Thurbon suffered leg injuries in the Nebraska game and were unable to start. Coach Bowser started Walt West at quarterback and Ernest Bonelli at halfback. Edgar Jones boasted: "If we can't beat this State team we ought to quit. We should take them by a couple of touchdowns. We haven't been too bad this year. With a break here or there our record would be much better."

Bill McElwain of The Pitt News reported: "There was a pep rally at Memorial Hall last Friday, not a very successful pep rally. In fact, an over-enthused bunch of near-rowdies, plus a broken microphone on the public address system, turned what was intended as a tribute to the football team into a farce. It became so much of a farce that the football team walked off the stage thoroughly disgusted, and head coach Charley Bowser gave the students who were still in the hall a sizzling and unequivocal tongue-lashing."

The riled-up Panthers erased the Nittany Lions bowl game aspirations with a 20–7 upset. The Panthers took the lead in the first quarter on a 49-yard touchdown run. Fullback George Kracum ran the first 44 yards and, as he was about to be tackled, he lateraled to Ralph Fife, who raced the final 5 yards for the touchdown. Ernest Bonelli missed the extra point. Late in the half Penn State drove to the Panther 28-yard line, but lost the ball on downs. The Panthers scored in the third period on a 19-yard touchdown pass from Edgar Jones to Robert Thurbon. Fife added the placement and Pitt led 13–0 at the end of three quarters. The Lions offense answered with a 5-play, 53-yard touchdown drive to start the final period. William Smaltz connected with Leonard Krouse on a 14-yard touchdown pass. Ben Pollack added the point after to cut the lead to 13–7. Kracum then picked off an errant Penn State pass and returned it 35 yards for Pitt's final touchdown. Fife booted the extra point. Pitt 20 to Penn State 7.

Coach Higgins stated: "Pitt played great football all the way. I was disappointed when Kracum got away for that long run on that fake reverse early in the game....But the Panthers played smart football and deserved to win." Penn State ended their season with a 6–1–1 record, received no bowl bid and dropped out of the top 20.

The Pitt starting lineup for the game against Penn State was Stanley Gervelis (left end), Ted Konetsky (left tackle), Rudy Gradisek (left guard), Stephen Sinco (center), Ralph Fife (right guard), John Benz (right tackle), Jack Goodridge (right end), Walter West (quarterback), Edgar Jones (left halfback), Ernest Bonelli (right halfback) and George Kracum (fullback). Substitutes appearing in the game for Pitt were John Stahl, William Benghouser, Harry Kindelberger, Vincent Antonelli, Harris Hawkins, Jack Stetler, William Dutton, John Ross, Thomas Murphy, Alfred Gurczenski, George Mitchell, Joseph Connell, George Allshouse, Harold Hinte, Walter Ward, Paul Foley, Robert Thurbon, Thomas Murphy, Mike Sekela, Joseph Connell, Ralph Hammond, Louis Sleber and William Fitchco.

Scoring summary

Quarter	Time	Drive			Team	Scoring information	Score	
Quarter	Time	Plays	Yards	TOP	Team	Scoring information	Penn State	Pittsburgh
1		2	51		Pittsburgh	George Kracum and Ralph Fife 49-yard touchdown run, Ernest Bonelli kick no good	0	6
3		4	41		Pittsburgh	Robert Thurbon 19-yard touchdown reception from Edgar Jones, Ralph Fife kick good	0	13
4		5	53		Penn State	Leonard Krouse 14-yard touchdown reception from William Smaltz, Ben Pollack kick good	7	13
4		1	35		Pittsburgh	Interception returned 35 yards for touchdown by George Kracum, Ralph Fifie kick good	7	20
"TOP" = time of possession. For other American football terms, see Glossary of American football.							7	20

=== At Duke ===
Week 8: Pitt at Duke

Team	1	2	3	4	Total
Pitt	0	7	0	0	7
• Duke	7	3	2	0	12

- Date: September 28, 1940
- Location: Duke Stadium
  Durham, NC
- Game start: 2:00 p.m.
- Game attendance: 27,000
- Game weather: fair and chilly
- Referee: B. L. Eberts (Catholic U.)

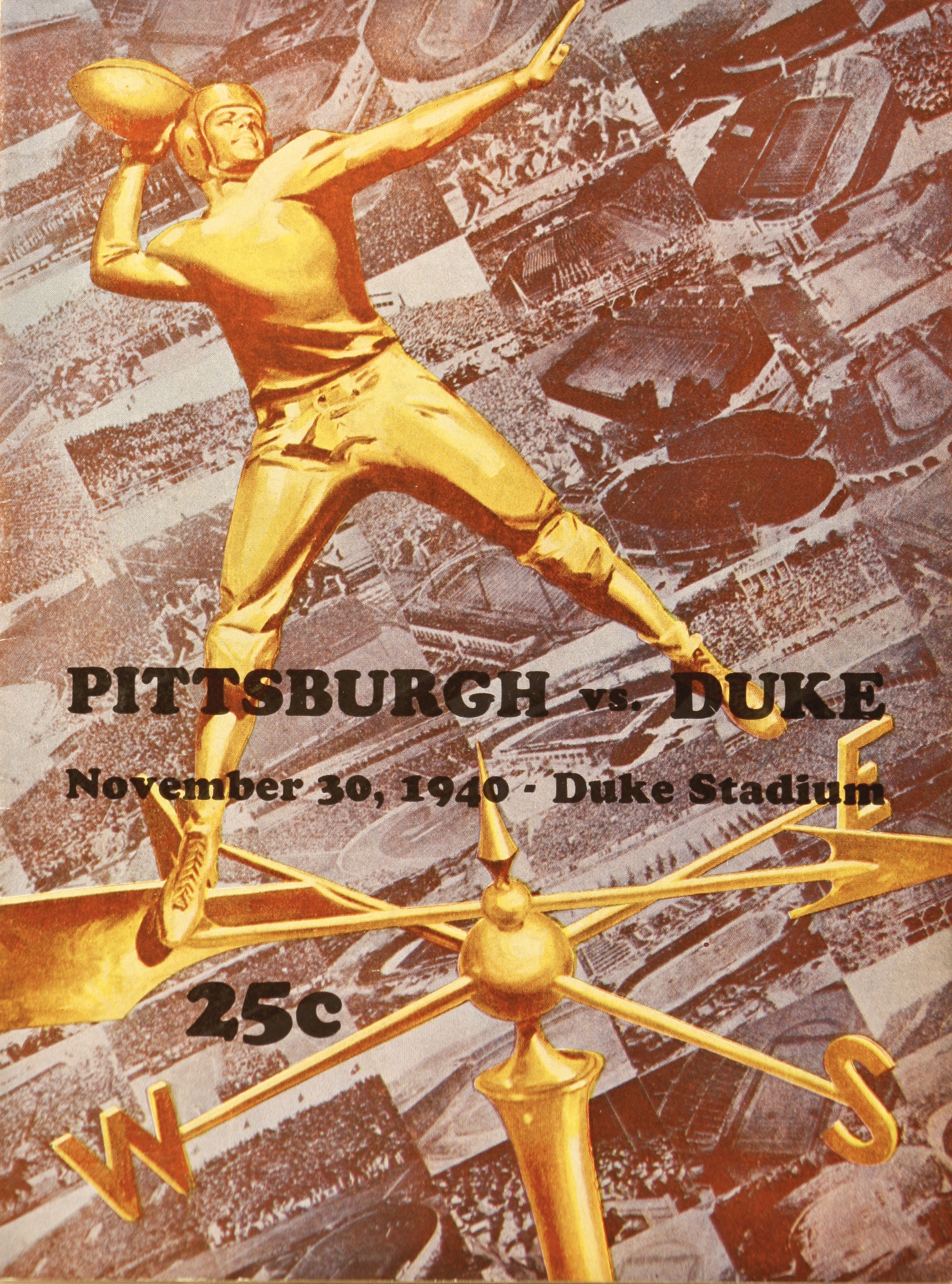
Program for November 30 game versus Duke

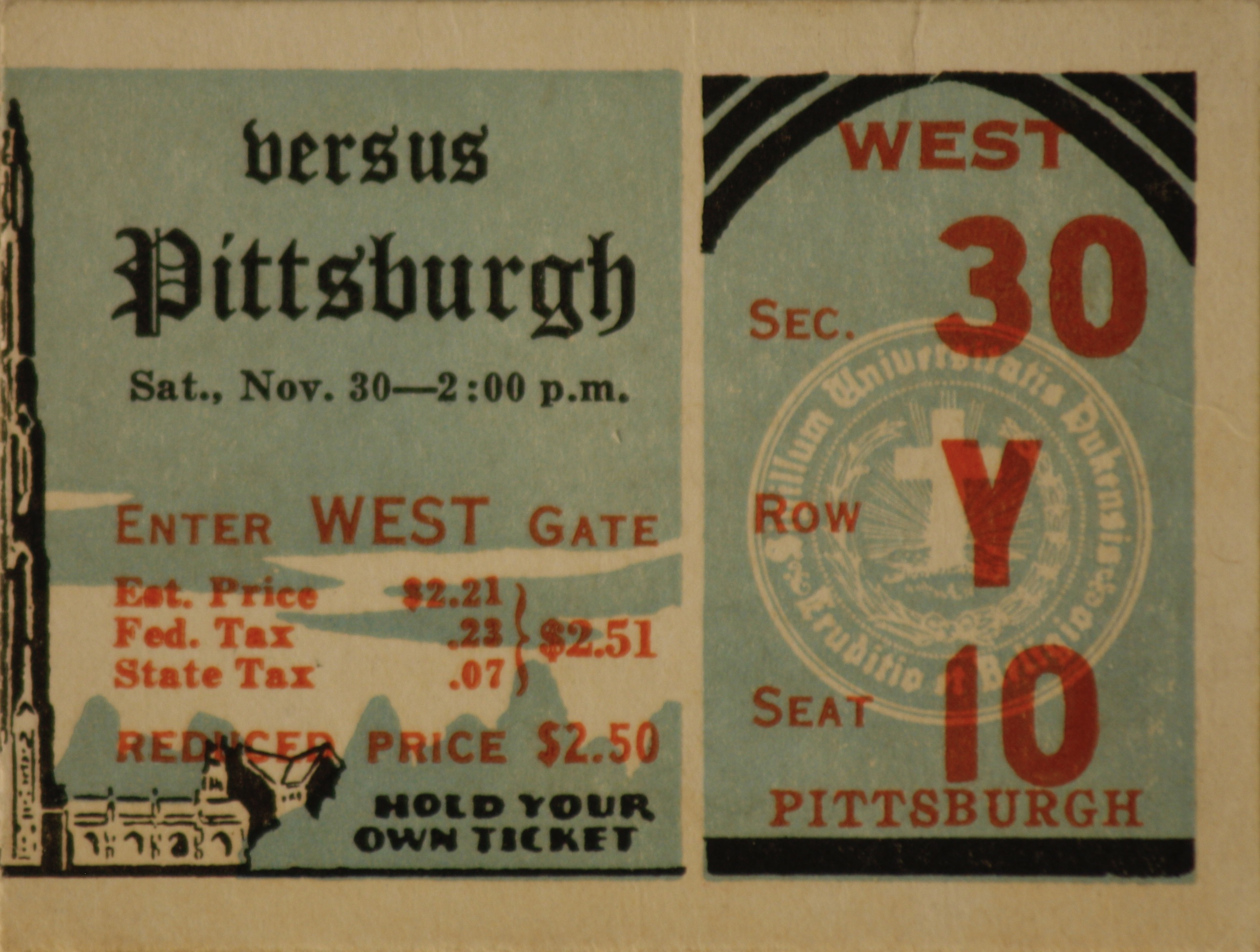
Ticket stub for November 30 game versus Duke

The Panthers closed their season with a trip to Durham, NC to play the Duke Blue Devils. Wallace Wade's squad had a 6–2 record. Duke beat VMI, Colgate, Wake Forest, Georgia Tech, Davidson, and NC State. They lost to Tennessee and UNC. The Devils finished in second place in the Southern Conference and ranked #18 in the final Associated Press football poll. All-American tackle Tony Ruffa anchored the Duke line, and Tommy Prothro led the Devils at quarterback.

Coach Bowser took a squad of 33 Panthers to Durham. Seven Pitt starters were seniors suiting up for their final game. They were Ted Konetsky, Jack Benz, Rudy Gradisek, Jack Goodridge, Bob Thurbon, George Kracum and Mike Sekela. The senior substitutes were Joe Rettinger (injured), Al Gurczenski, Harris Hawkins, Lou Sleber, Ernie Bonelli, Earl Pressel, Carl Sardi and Paul Foley.

The Panthers came within 2 yards of victory but the Duke Blue Devils prevailed 12–7 and sent the Panthers home with their first losing record since 1912. The Devils amassed their points by means of a touchdown, extra point, field goal and safety. Duke opened the scoring in the first period with a 10-play, 53-yard drive, that ended with a 11-yard touchdown pass from Wes McAfee to Steve Lach. Tony Ruffa added the extra point. Early in the second period, Pitt gained possession on their 21-yard line. Jack Stetler scampered 78 yards to the Duke 1-yard line on first down. George Kracum scored the touchdown and Ralph Fife was good on the point after to tie the game. Duke answered with a 14-play, 68-yard drive that placed the ball on the Pitt 4-yard line. The Panther defense stiffened, but Tony Ruffa booted an 11-yard field goal for a 10–7 Duke lead at halftime. Duke added the safety in the third period. Pitt was on their own 12-yard line and a poor center snap rolled into the end zone. It was recovered by Pitt's Edgar Jones but he was tackled for the two-pointer. The Pitt offense drove the ball to the Duke 3-yard line late in the game. Four Panther rushing plays only moved the ball to the 2-yard line. Pitt's final record was 3–4–1.

The Pitt starting lineup for the game against Duke was Stanley Gervelis (left end), Ted Konetsky (left tackle), Rudy Gradisek (left guard), Stephen Sinco (center), Ralph Fife (right guard), John Benz (right tackle), Jack Goodridge (right end), Mike Sekela (quarterback), Edgar Jones (left halfback), Robert Thurbon (right halfback) and George Kracum (fullback). Substitutes appearing in the game for Pitt were William Benghouser, Harry Kindelberger, Vincent Antonelli, Jack Stetler, Ernest Bonelli, William Dutton, John Ross, Alfred Gurczenski, George Mitchell, George Allshouse, Walter West, Walter Ward, Paul Foley and William Fitchco.

Scoring summary

Quarter	Time	Drive			Team	Scoring information	Score	
Quarter	Time	Plays	Yards	TOP	Team	Scoring information	Pittsburgh	Duke
1		10	53		Duke	Steve Lach 11-yard touchdown reception from Wesley McAfee, Tony Ruffa kick good	0	7
2		2	79		Pittsburgh	George Kracum 1-yard touchdown run, Ralph Fife kick good	7	7
2		14	68		Duke	11-yard field goal by Tony Ruffa	7	10
3		2	14		Duke	Edgar Jones tackled in end zone for a safety by Mike Karmazin	7	12
"TOP" = time of possession. For other American football terms, see Glossary of American football.							7	12

== Individual scoring summary ==
1940 Pittsburgh Panthers scoring summary
Player	Touchdowns	Extra points	Field goals	Safety	Points
Edgar Jones	4	1	0	0	25
Robert Thurbon	4	0	0	0	24
George Kracum	3	0	0	0	18
Ralph Fife	1	3	0	0	9
Ernest Bonelli	1	0	0	0	6
Michael Sekela	0	3	0	0	6
Totals	13	7	0	0	85

== Postseason ==
George Kracum was selected for the annual East-West Shrine Game played in San Francisco on New Year's Day.

Letters were awarded to 23 football players and the varsity manager at the first Sports Assembly and Banquet on December 13, 1940. The following received letters: Vincent Antonelli, John Benz, Thomas Murphy, John Gates, William Benghouser, Ernie Bonelli, Ralph Fife, Stanley Gervelis, Jack Goodridge, Rudy Gradisek, Al Gurczenski, Harris Hawkins, Edgar Jones, Harry Kindelberger, Ted Konetsky, George Kracum, George Mitchell, Joe Rettinger, Mike Sekela, Stephen Sinco, Jack Stetler, Robert Thurbon, Walter West and Harry Korp.

Frank Mecca, Pitt Stadium groundskeeper from 1925-1940, died on December 27, 1940. He was so devoted to the stadium turf that the players referred to it as "Mecca Stadium." His last wish was to be carried to his grave by 6 of his football boys. Ernie Bonelli, John Benz, Nick Kliskey, John Dickinson, Luby DeMeleo and Jess Quatse honored his wishes.

== Team players drafted into the NFL ==
The following player was selected in the 1941 NFL draft.

Player	Position	Round	Pick	NFL club
George Kracum	Back	8	63	Chicago Cardinals
