= 1940 Iowa State Cyclones football team =

American college football season

1940 Iowa State Cyclones football
- Conference: Big Six Conference
- Record: 4–5 (2–3 Big 6)
- Head coach: James J. Yeager (4th season)
- Captain: Tom Smith
- Home stadium: Clyde Williams Field

1940 Big Six Conference football standings
	Conf.					Overall
Team	W		L		T	W		L		T
No. 7 Nebraska $	5	–	0	–	0	8	–	2	–	0
Oklahoma	4	–	1	–	0	6	–	3	–	0
Missouri	3	–	2	–	0	6	–	3	–	0
Iowa State	2	–	3	–	0	4	–	5	–	0
Kansas State	1	–	4	–	0	2	–	7	–	0
Kansas	0	–	5	–	0	2	–	7	–	0
$ – Conference champion; Rankings from AP Poll

The 1940 Iowa State Cyclones football team represented Iowa State College of Agricultural and Mechanic Arts (later renamed Iowa State University) in the Big Six Conference during the 1940 college football season. In their fourth and final season under head coach James J. Yeager, the Cyclones compiled a 4–5 record (2–3 against conference opponents), finished in fourth place in the conference, and were outscored by their opponents by a combined total of 132 to 118.

Tom Smith was the team captain. No Iowa State player was selected as a first-team all-conference player.

Iowa State was ranked at No. 103 (out of 697 college football teams) in the final rankings under the Litkenhous Difference by Score system for 1940.

They played their home games at Clyde Williams Field in Ames, Iowa.

== Schedule ==
Date	Time	Opponent	Site	Result	Attendance	Source
September 21	2:00 p.m.	Luther*	Clyde Williams Field; Ames, IA	W 27–0	7,249	
September 27	9:15 p.m.	at Denver*	DU Stadium; Denver, CO	L 7–14	13,651	
October 5	2:00 p.m.	Kansas	Clyde Williams Field; Ames, IA	W 7–0	7,491	
October 11	8:00 p.m.	at Marquette*	Marquette Stadium; Milwaukee, WI	L 25–41	15,000	
October 19	2:00 p.m.	at Missouri	Memorial Stadium; Columbia, MO (rivalry)	L 14–30	12,457	
October 26	2:00 p.m.	Oklahoma^{†}	Clyde Williams Field; Ames, IA	L 7–20	11,424	
November 9	2:00 p.m.	Drake*	Clyde Williams Field; Ames, IA	W 7–6	5,444	
November 16	2:00 p.m.	at Kansas State	Memorial Stadium; Manhattan, KS (rivalry)	W 12–0	7,936	
November 23	2:00 p.m.	at No. 8 Nebraska	Memorial Stadium; Lincoln, NE (rivalry)	L 12–21	17,541	
*Non-conference game; ^{†}Homecoming; Rankings from AP Poll released prior to the game; All times are in Central time
