= 1940 Missouri Tigers football team =

American college football season

1940 Missouri Tigers football
- Conference: Big Six Conference
- Record: 6–3 (3–2 Big 6)
- Head coach: Don Faurot (6th season)
- Home stadium: Memorial Stadium

1940 Big Six Conference football standings
| | Conf. | | | | | Overall |
| Team | W | | L | | T | W | | L | | T |
|---|---|---|---|---|---|---|---|---|---|---|
| No. 7 Nebraska $ | 5 | – | 0 | – | 0 | 8 | – | 2 | – | 0 |
| Oklahoma | 4 | – | 1 | – | 0 | 6 | – | 3 | – | 0 |
| Missouri | 3 | – | 2 | – | 0 | 6 | – | 3 | – | 0 |
| Iowa State | 2 | – | 3 | – | 0 | 4 | – | 5 | – | 0 |
| Kansas State | 1 | – | 4 | – | 0 | 2 | – | 7 | – | 0 |
| Kansas | 0 | – | 5 | – | 0 | 2 | – | 7 | – | 0 |
$ – Conference champion; Rankings from AP Poll

The 1940 Missouri Tigers football team was an American football team that represented the University of Missouri in the Big Six Conference (Big 6) during the 1940 college football season. The team compiled a 6–3 record (3–2 against Big 6 opponents), finished in third place in the Big 6, and outscored all opponents by a combined total of 213 to 135. Don Faurot was the head coach for the sixth of 19 seasons.

The team's leading scorer was Harry Ice with 42 points.

Missouri was ranked at No. 37 (out of 697 college football teams) in the final rankings under the Litkenhous Difference by Score system for 1940.

The team played its home games at Memorial Stadium in Columbia, Missouri.

== Schedule ==
| Date | Opponent | Site | Result | Attendance | Source |
|---|---|---|---|---|---|
| September 28 | Saint Louis* | Memorial Stadium; Columbia, MO | W 40–26 | | |
| October 5 | at Pittsburgh* | Pitt Stadium; Pittsburgh, PA | L 13–19 | 26,000 | |
| October 12 | at Kansas State | Memorial Stadium; Manhattan, KS | W 24–13 | | |
| October 19 | Iowa State | Memorial Stadium; Columbia, MO (rivalry) | W 30–14 | 12,457 | |
| October 26 | at No. 18 Nebraska | Memorial Stadium; Lincoln, NE (rivalry) | L 7–20 | | |
| November 2 | NYU* | Memorial Stadium; Columbia, MO | W 33–0 | 22,000 | |
| November 9 | at Colorado* | Colorado Stadium; Boulder, CO | W 21–6 | | |
| November 16 | at Oklahoma | Memorial Stadium; Norman, OK (rivalry) | L 0–7 | | |
| November 21 | Kansas | Memorial Stadium; Columbia, MO (rivalry) | W 45–20 | 17,000 | |
*Non-conference game; Rankings from AP Poll released prior to the game
