= 1940 Nebraska Cornhuskers football team =

American college football season

1940 Nebraska Cornhuskers football

Big 6 champion

Rose Bowl, L 13–21 vs. Stanford
- Conference: Big Six Conference

Ranking
- AP: No. 7
- Record: 8–2 (5–0 Big 6)
- Head coach: Biff Jones (4th season)
- Offensive scheme: Single-wing
- Home stadium: Memorial Stadium

1940 Big Six Conference football standings
	Conf.					Overall
Team	W		L		T	W		L		T
No. 7 Nebraska $	5	–	0	–	0	8	–	2	–	0
Oklahoma	4	–	1	–	0	6	–	3	–	0
Missouri	3	–	2	–	0	6	–	3	–	0
Iowa State	2	–	3	–	0	4	–	5	–	0
Kansas State	1	–	4	–	0	2	–	7	–	0
Kansas	0	–	5	–	0	2	–	7	–	0
$ – Conference champion; Rankings from AP Poll

The 1940 Nebraska Cornhuskers football team was an American football team that represented the University of Nebraska in the Big Six Conference during the 1940 college football season. In its fourth season under head coach Biff Jones, the team compiled an 8–2 record (5–0 against conference opponents), won the Big Six championship, was ranked No. 7 in the final AP Poll, and lost to Stanford in the 1941 Rose Bowl. The Cornhuskers outscored opponents by a total of 183 to 75. The team played its home games at Memorial Stadium in Lincoln, Nebraska.

Two Nebraska players received honors on the 1940 All-America team. Guard Warren Alfson was named to the first team by the Associated Press and International News Service and to the second team by the United Press and Central Press Association. Tackle Forrest Behm was named to the first team by the Newspaper Enterprise Association.

Five Cornhuskers received first-team honors from the United Press on the 1940 All-Big Six Conference football team: Alfson; Behm; halfback Harry Hopp; Walter Luther; and Ray Prochaska.

== Before the season ==
Coach Jones returned in an effort to have more consistent success as Nebraska head coach. After a conference championship first year, a record-setting second year of losses, and then a rebound in the last year which included wins over Minnesota and Pittsburgh in the same year for the first time in team history, the goal was a conference title and returning to the top of the league.

== Schedule ==
Date	Time	Opponent	Rank	Site	Result	Attendance	Source
October 5	2:00 p.m.	at Minnesota*		Memorial Stadium; Minneapolis, MN (rivalry)	L 7–13	41,000	
October 12	2:00 p.m.	Indiana*		Memorial Stadium; Lincoln, NE	W 13–7		
October 19	2:00 p.m.	at Kansas		Memorial Stadium; Lawrence, KS (rivalry)	W 53–2	13,000	
October 26	2:00 p.m.	Missouri^{†}	No. 18	Memorial Stadium; Lincoln, NE (rivalry)	W 20–7		
November 2	2:00 p.m.	at Oklahoma	No. 12	Owen Field; Norman, OK (rivalry)	W 13–0	33,377	
November 9	2:00 p.m.	Iowa*	No. 12	Memorial Stadium; Lincoln, NE (rivalry)	W 14–6		
November 16	1:00 p.m.	at Pittsburgh*	No. 11	Pitt Stadium; Pittsburgh, PA	W 9–7	22,000	
November 23	2:00 p.m.	Iowa State	No. 8	Memorial Stadium; Lincoln, NE (rivalry)	W 21–12	17,541	
November 30	2:00 p.m.	Kansas State	No. 8	Memorial Stadium; Lincoln, NE (rivalry)	W 20–0	20,000	
January 1, 1941	4:00 p.m.	vs. No. 2 Stanford*	No. 7	Rose Bowl; Pasadena, CA (Rose Bowl)	L 13–21	92,000	
*Non-conference game; ^{†}Homecoming; Rankings from AP Poll released prior to the game; All times are in Central time

== Rankings ==
Ranking movements Legend: ██ Increase in ranking ██ Decrease in ranking — = Not ranked т = Tied with team above or below
	Week							
Poll	1	2	3	4	5	6	7	Final
AP	—	18	12	12т	11	8	8	7

== Roster ==
Abel, George #47 G Alfson, Warren #22 G Behm, Forrest #33 T Blue, Wayne #39 HB; Bradley, Dale #42 HB; Bryant, William #29 G Bunker, Willard #46 E Burruss, Robert #49 C Francis, Vike #38 FB; Greenlief, Francis #18 G Hazen, Jack #32 E Herndon, Clarence #34 T Hopp, Harry #37 FB; Kahler, Robert #35 HB; Kahler, Royal #54 T Kathol, Gerald #12 E Kelly, Howard #56 C Knight, George #21 QB; Leik, Francis #52 T Ludwick, Robert #30 E	Luther, Walter #27 HB; Meier, Fred #20 C Metheny, Fred #36 QB; Muskin, Leonard #53 T Myers, Lynn #48 G Petsch, Roy #13 QB; Preston, Fred #50 E Prochaska, Ray #31 E Rohn, Henry #15 FB; Rohrig, Herman #25 HB; Rubottom, Don #10 HB; Schleich, Victor #57 T Schwartzkopf, Ed #17 G Simmons, Kenneth #19 HB; Thompson, Marvin #44 E Thompson, Theos #26 HB; Vincent, Jack #23 HB; VonGoetz, Herbert #48 G Whitehead, Ralph #16 T Zikmund, Allen #59 HB

== Coaching staff ==
Name	Title	First year in this position	Years at Nebraska	Alma mater
Biff Jones	Head Coach	1937	1937–1941	Army
W. Harold Browne	Assistant Coach	1930	1930–1940	
Roy Lyman		1936	1936–1941	Nebraska
Harold Petz		1938	1936, 1938–1940	
Charles Armstrong		1937	1937–1942, 1944	
Adolph J. Lewandowski		1937	1937–1944	Nebraska
Paul Amen		1938	1938–1941	
Glenn Presnell		1938	1938–1942, 1946	Nebraska

== Game summaries ==
=== Minnesota ===
Nebraska at Minnesota

Team	1	2	3	4	Total
Nebraska	0	0	7	0	7
• Minnesota	0	7	6	0	13

- Date: October 5
- Location: Memorial Stadium • Minneapolis

The Cornhuskers faced the ultimate test to start their season, going up against the #1 Minnesota Golden Gophers in Minneapolis. The Gophers already had played one game to tune up. The scoreless draw was broken open when Minnesota put one touchdown in before the half. It wasn't until the third quarter that Nebraska scored a touchdown to tie it up, but the Gophers quickly responded to keep their lead. When the Cornhuskers answered later in the third on a long reverse play, the tying score was called back on an offsides penalty and Nebraska was unable to put the ball over again as they fell to 4–16–2 in the series.

=== Indiana ===
Indiana at Nebraska

Team	1	2	Total
Indiana			7
• Nebraska			13

- Date: October 12
- Location: Memorial Stadium • Lincoln, Nebraska

Indiana arrived in Lincoln to open Nebraska's home schedule, and quickly found themselves scrambling to keep up as the Cornhuskers jumped out to a 13–0 lead by halftime. The Hoosiers did manage one third quarter score, but were unable to come up with enough to get the win. Indiana remained winless against Nebraska all time, at 0–3–2.

=== Kansas ===
Nebraska at Kansas

Team	1	2	Total
• Nebraska			53
Kansas			2

- Date: October 19
- Location: Memorial Stadium • Lawrence, Kansas

Nebraska absolutely unloaded on Kansas in Lawrence, seemingly running into the end zone at will and rolling up 53 points. It was the most points scored and tied the record largest margin of victory since Grinnell fell to Nebraska 58–0 in 1927. Kansas managed to avoid the shutout only by the grace of a Cornhusker kicker slipping in the end zone to give up a safety. Nebraska was now 35–9–3 in the series, and had kept Kansas winless in 24 straight tries. Nebraska appeared at #18 in the AP Poll.

=== Missouri ===
Missouri at #18 Nebraska

Team	1	2	Total
Missouri			7
• #18 Nebraska			20

- Date: October 26
- Location: Memorial Stadium • Lincoln, Nebraska

Nebraska took back the Missouri-Nebraska Bell with their defeat of defending Big 6 champion Missouri in Lincoln. If not for a successful play in the last sixty seconds of the game, the Tigers would have been forced to suffer the additional indignity of a shutout. As it was, they still had to live with their 8–23–3 record against Nebraska all-time. The win boosted Nebraska to #12 in the AP Poll.

=== Oklahoma ===
#12 Nebraska at Oklahoma

Team	1	2	Total
• #12 Nebraska			13
Oklahoma			0

- Date: November 2
- Location: Oklahoma Memorial Stadium • Norman, Oklahoma

The Cornhuskers dealt another hand of disappointment to the Sooners, overcoming their own weak line play in the first half. It wasn't until 20 seconds remaining in the 2nd quarter that Nebraska found the scoreboard. After the break, both teams again pushed each other back and forth with nothing to show for their troubles until the fourth when the Cornhuskers used a big play to put the game out of reach and shut out Oklahoma in Norman. Nebraska was now 14–3–3 against the Sooners to date, but the win was not enough to move Nebraska up from their #12 AP Poll ranking.

=== Iowa ===
Iowa at #12 Nebraska

Team	1	2	3	4	Total
Iowa	0	6	0	0	6
• #12 Nebraska	7	7	0	0	14

- Date: November 9
- Location: Memorial Stadium • Lincoln, Nebraska

On a wet field, Nebraska struggled slightly at first, giving up a fumble to stall the first potential scoring drive. Undaunted, the Cornhuskers came back with two touchdowns in a row, though the Hawkeyes answered with a score of their own before the break. No further points would be tallied in the second half, and the win was Nebraska's fourth straight over Iowa as they improved to 19–7–3 all time and gained one spot in the AP Poll.

=== Pittsburgh ===
#11 Nebraska at Pittsburgh

Team	1	2	3	4	Total
• #11 Nebraska	6	0	3	0	9
Pittsburgh	7	0	0	0	7

- Date: November 16
- Location: Pitt Stadium • Pittsburgh

Pittsburgh was not at all accustomed to playing Nebraska from the perspective of avenging a loss, but after having their 12-game streak over the Cornhuskers broken the previous year, sights were set on putting Nebraska back in their place as they were brought to Pitt Stadium. The Cornhuskers scored first in a bid to prove that 1939 was no fluke, but the Panthers answered right back soon after. As Nebraska had failed to convert, Pittsburgh now held a 7–6 lead and fought to a standoff until halftime. Before the end of the third quarter, though, the Cornhuskers managed to punch in a field goal to go ahead, and successfully held off the Panthers for the rest of the game. It was the first time Nebraska had defeated Pittsburgh twice in a row in all 15 tries, and the victory moved the Cornhuskers up to #8 in the AP Poll, though they still lagged in the series at 3–9–3.

=== Iowa State ===
Iowa State at #8 Nebraska

Team	1	2	Total
Iowa State			12
• #8 Nebraska			21

- Date: November 23
- Location: Memorial Stadium • Lincoln, Nebraska
- Game attendance: 17,541

Perhaps Nebraska was feeling overconfident after their win in Pittsburgh, but whatever the reason was, Iowa State promptly had the Cornhuskers on their heels early on. After an initial Cyclone touchdown broke the ice, Iowa State blocked and recovered a Nebraska punt, successfully converting it into a second touchdown to lead the Cornhuskers 12–0 by halftime. Words in the locker room at the break probably had much to do with the storm that emerged in the second half, as Nebraska blasted the line and racked up 21 unanswered points to take the game back from the Cyclones and improve to 29–5–1 against Iowa State to date. This was Nebraska's 100th conference victory, dating back to the Missouri Valley Intercollegiate Athletic Association which preceded the Big 6. The AP Poll was not impressed by the somewhat weak victory, and kept Nebraska at #8.

=== Kansas State ===
Kansas State at #8 Nebraska

Team	1	2	Total
Kansas State			0
• #8 Nebraska			20

- Date: November 30
- Location: Memorial Stadium • Lincoln, Nebraska

Nebraska scored without serious challenge in each of the first three quarters while also keeping the Wildcats off the board despite all efforts by Kansas State to try to avoid the shutout that was due to be dealt. With the win, Nebraska completed the Big 6 conference slate with all wins and took home the conference championship banner again after a two-year drought. It was the fifth straight Nebraska win over Kansas State as the Cornhuskers moved up to #7 in the AP Poll and continued to own the series, which was now advanced to 21–2–2.

=== Stanford ===
#7 Nebraska vs. #2 Stanford

Team	1	2	3	4	Total
#7 Nebraska	7	6	0	0	13
• #2 Stanford	7	7	7	0	21

- Date: January 1
- Location: Rose Bowl • Pasadena, California (1941 Rose Bowl)
- Game attendance: 92,000

Nebraska, undefeated all season save for the loss to #1 Minnesota, was invited to the program's first ever postseason game to play #2 Stanford in the Rose Bowl. So momentous was the occasion that classes were canceled as celebrations spilled out across the campus after the announcement. In Pasadena, after the formalities and parades were completed, the football teams set to the business of deciding the Rose Bowl title for the 1940 season. The Cornhuskers struck first and momentarily set Stanford back, but it did not take the Indians very long to answer. In the second quarter, Nebraska again punched in some points, but this time Stanford's answer left the Cornhuskers a point short after due to a missed Nebraska place kick. Stanford's defensive adjustments stymied Nebraska afterwards, and when Nebraska was pinned on their own 1 in the third quarter, the Cornhuskers opted to punt out of danger. Fate stepped in and handed Stanford a punt return for touchdown on that play, and with no more points scored on the day, the game was decided. This was the only time Nebraska ever met Stanford.

== After the season ==
Nebraska achieved two key accomplishments over the previous season, outdoing the high mark of 1939's same-season defeats of Minnesota and Pittsburgh, by regaining the championship of the Big 6 and also by participating in the Nebraska football program's first ever bowl game at the storied Rose Bowl. Since coach Jones was unbeaten on the Big 6 slate, his conference record moved up to 14–4–2 (.750), as his Nebraska career record rose to 24–9–4 (.703). He helped improve the program's overall record to 294–98–31 (.732) and the Big 6 record to 101–15–11 (.839). The future at Nebraska seemed to be bright indeed, but the shadows of the growing war in Europe were beginning to grow and darken the world.
