= 1940 Oklahoma Sooners football team =

American college football season

1940 Oklahoma Sooners football
- Conference: Big Six Conference
- Record: 6–3 (4–1 Big 6)
- Head coach: Tom Stidham (4th season)
- Captain: Gus Kitchens
- Home stadium: Owen Field

1940 Big Six Conference football standings
	Conf.					Overall
Team	W		L		T	W		L		T
No. 7 Nebraska $	5	–	0	–	0	8	–	2	–	0
Oklahoma	4	–	1	–	0	6	–	3	–	0
Missouri	3	–	2	–	0	6	–	3	–	0
Iowa State	2	–	3	–	0	4	–	5	–	0
Kansas State	1	–	4	–	0	2	–	7	–	0
Kansas	0	–	5	–	0	2	–	7	–	0
$ – Conference champion; Rankings from AP Poll

The 1940 Oklahoma Sooners football team represented the University of Oklahoma in the 1940 college football season. In their fourth year under head coach Tom Stidham, the Sooners compiled a 6–3 record (4–1 against conference opponents), finished in second place in the Big Six Conference, and outscored their opponents by a combined total of 121 to 105.

No Sooners received All-America honors in 1940, but four Sooners received all-conference honors: tackle Roger Eason, end Bill Jennings, guard Harold Lahar, and back John Martin.

Oklahoma was ranked at No. 45 (out of 697 college football teams) in the final rankings under the Litkenhous Difference by Score system for 1940.

== Schedule ==
Date	Opponent	Site	Result	Attendance	Source
October 5	at Oklahoma A&M*	Lewis Field; Stillwater, OK (Bedlam)	W 29–27		
October 12	vs. Texas*	Cotton Bowl; Dallas, TX (rivalry)	L 16–19	35,000	
October 19	Kansas State	Owen Field; Norman, OK	W 14–0		
October 26	at Iowa State	Clyde Williams Stadium; Ames, IA	W 20–7	11,424	
November 2	No. 12 Nebraska	Owen Field; Norman, OK (rivalry)	L 0–13	33,377	
November 9	at Kansas	Memorial Stadium; Lawrence, KS	W 13–0	5,000	
November 16	Missouri	Owen Field; Norman, OK (rivalry)	W 7–0		
November 23	Temple*	Owen Field; Norman, OK	W 9–6	7,000	
November 30	at No. 15 Santa Clara*	Kezar Stadium; San Francisco, CA	L 13–33	5,000	
*Non-conference game; Rankings from AP Poll released prior to the game

== NFL draft ==
The following players were drafted into the National Football League following the season.

Round	Pick	Player	Position	NFL team
9	79	Hal Lahar	Guard	Chicago Bears
14	128	Johnny Martin	Back	Chicago Bears
