= 1940 Kansas State Wildcats football team =

American college football season

1940 Kansas State Wildcats football
- Conference: Big Six Conference
- Record: 2–7 (1–4 Big 6)
- Head coach: Hobbs Adams (1st season)
- Home stadium: Memorial Stadium

1940 Big Six Conference football standings
	Conf.					Overall
Team	W		L		T	W		L		T
No. 7 Nebraska $	5	–	0	–	0	8	–	2	–	0
Oklahoma	4	–	1	–	0	6	–	3	–	0
Missouri	3	–	2	–	0	6	–	3	–	0
Iowa State	2	–	3	–	0	4	–	5	–	0
Kansas State	1	–	4	–	0	2	–	7	–	0
Kansas	0	–	5	–	0	2	–	7	–	0
$ – Conference champion; Rankings from AP Poll

The 1940 Kansas State Wildcats football team represented Kansas State University in the 1940 college football season. The team's head football coach was Hobbs Adams, in his first year of his first tenure at the helm of the Wildcats. The Wildcats played their home games in Memorial Stadium. The Wildcats finished the season with a 2–7 record with a 1–4 record in conference play. They finished in fifth place in the Big Six Conference. The Wildcats scored 73 points and gave up 145 points.

Kansas State was ranked at No. 104 (out of 697 college football teams) in the final rankings under the Litkenhous Difference by Score system for 1940.

== Schedule ==
Date	Opponent	Site	Result	Attendance	Source
September 28	Kansas State Teachers*	Memorial Stadium; Manhattan, KS	W 21–16	5,000	
October 5	at Colorado*	Folsom Field; Boulder, CO (rivalry)	L 6–7		
October 12	Missouri	Memorial Stadium; Manhattan, KS	L 13–24	11,000	
October 19	at Oklahoma	Oklahoma Memorial Stadium; Norman, OK	L 0–14	16,000	
October 26	Kansas^{†}	Memorial Stadium; Manhattan, KS (rivalry)	W 20–0	14,000	
November 2	at Michigan State*	Macklin Field; East Lansing, MI	L 0–32	20,000	
November 9	at South Carolina*	Columbia Municipal Stadium; Columbia, SC	L 13–20	11,000	
November 16	Iowa State	Memorial Stadium; Manhattan, KS (rivalry)	L 0–12	7,936	
November 30	at No. 8 Nebraska	Memorial Stadium; Lincoln, NE (rivalry)	L 0–20	20,000	
*Non-conference game; ^{†}Homecoming; Rankings from AP Poll released prior to the game
