= 1940 Kansas Jayhawks football team =

American college football season

1940 Kansas Jayhawks football
- Conference: Big Six Conference
- Record: 2–7 (0–5 Big 6)
- Head coach: Gwinn Henry (2nd season)
- Captain: Don Pierce
- Home stadium: Memorial Stadium

1940 Big Six Conference football standings
	Conf.					Overall
Team	W		L		T	W		L		T
No. 7 Nebraska $	5	–	0	–	0	8	–	2	–	0
Oklahoma	4	–	1	–	0	6	–	3	–	0
Missouri	3	–	2	–	0	6	–	3	–	0
Iowa State	2	–	3	–	0	4	–	5	–	0
Kansas State	1	–	4	–	0	2	–	7	–	0
Kansas	0	–	5	–	0	2	–	7	–	0
$ – Conference champion; Rankings from AP Poll

The 1940 Kansas Jayhawks football team represented the University of Kansas in the Big Six Conference during the 1940 college football season. In their second season under head coach Gwinn Henry, the Jayhawks compiled a 2–7 record (0–5 against conference opponents), finished in last place in the conference, and were outscored by opponents by a combined total of 183 to 75.

The team's statistical leaders included Ed Hall with 294 rushing yards, 251 passing yards, and 27 points scored (four touchdowns and three extra points), and Don Pollom with 158 receiving yards. Don Pierce was the team captain.

Kansas was ranked at No. 153 (out of 697 college football teams) in the final rankings under the Litkenhous Difference by Score system for 1940.

The team played its home games at Memorial Stadium in Lawrence, Kansas.

== Schedule ==
Date	Opponent	Site	Result	Attendance	Source
October 5	at Iowa State	Clyde Williams Field; Ames, IA	L 0–7	7,491	
October 12	Drake	Memorial Stadium; Lawrence, KS	W 20–6	8,000	
October 19	Nebraska	Memorial Stadium; Lawrence, KS (rivalry)	L 2–53	13,000	
October 26	at Kansas State	Memorial Stadium; Manhattan, KS (Sunflower Showdown)	L 0–20	14,000	
November 1	at Villanova	Shibe Park; Philadelphia, PA	L 7–33	12,000	
November 9	Oklahoma^{†}	Memorial Stadium; Lawrence, KS	L 0–13	5,000	
November 16	at George Washington	Griffith Stadium; Washington, DC	L 0–6		
November 21	at Missouri	Memorial Stadium; Columbia, MO (Border War)	L 20–45	17,000	
November 28	Colorado A&M	Memorial Stadium; Lawrence, KS	W 26–0	3,000	
^{†}Homecoming
