= List of Nebraska College Conference football standings =

This is a list of yearly Nebraska College Conference football standings.

== Nebraska College Conference football standings ==
=== Pre-NAIA (1919–1955) ===
1919 Nebraska Intercollegiate Conference football standings
	Conf.					Overall
Team	W		L		T	W		L		T
York (NE) $	6	–	0	–	0	6	–	0	–	0
Nebraska Wesleyan	6	–	1	–	0	7	–	2	–	0
Peru Normal	4	–	2	–	0	5	–	2	–	0
Hastings	2	–	1	–	0	?	–	?	–	?
Cotner	2	–	4	–	0	?	–	?	–	?
Midland	2	–	4	–	0	2	–	4	–	0
Doane	1	–	4	–	0	5	–	1	–	1
Kearney Normal	1	–	4	–	0	?	–	?	–	?
Nebraska Central	0	–	4	–	0	0	–	4	–	0
$ – Conference champion

1920 Nebraska Intercollegiate Conference football standings
	Conf.					Overall
Team	W		L		T	W		L		T
Grand Island	6	–	0	–	1	6	–	0	–	2
Doane	5	–	0	–	1	5	–	1	–	1
Nebraska Wesleyan	4	–	0	–	1	6	–	2	–	2
Omaha	5	–	0	–	0	7	–	1	–	0
Hastings	5	–	2	–	1	5	–	2	–	1
Peru Normal	5	–	4	–	0	5	–	4	–	0
Midland	3	–	6	–	0	3	–	6	–	0
York (NE)	2	–	5	–	0	2	–	5	–	0
Wayne Normal	1	–	3	–	0	1	–	4	–	1
Cotner	1	–	6	–	0	1	–	6	–	0
Kearney Normal	1	–	7	–	0	1	–	7	–	0
Nebraska Central	0	–	6	–	0	0	–	6	–	0
Championship: Grand Island 0, Nebraska Wesleyan 0

1921 Nebraska Intercollegiate Conference football standings
	Conf.					Overall
Team	W		L		T	W		L		T
Nebraska Wesleyan $	5	–	0	–	0	8	–	3	–	0
Wayne Normal	5	–	0	–	0	6	–	2	–	0
Doane	4	–	2	–	1	5	–	3	–	1
Peru Normal	5	–	3	–	0	6	–	1	–	0
Kearney Normal	3	–	2	–	1	3	–	2	–	1
Hastings	3	–	3	–	2	4	–	3	–	2
York (NE)	3	–	4	–	0	3	–	5	–	0
Cotner	2	–	3	–	0	2	–	3	–	2
Midland	2	–	4	–	0	3	–	4	–	0
Grand Island	1	–	4	–	1	1	–	5	–	1
Chadron Normal	0	–	3	–	0	2	–	4	–	0
Nebraska Central	0	–	5	–	0	0	–	5	–	0
Championship: Nebraska Wesleyan 17, Wayne Normal 3
$ – Conference champion

1922 Nebraska Intercollegiate Conference football standings
	Conf.					Overall
Team	W		L		T	W		L		T
Midland $	7	–	0	–	1	7	–	1	–	1
Peru Normal	5	–	1	–	0	6	–	1	–	0
Nebraska Wesleyan	4	–	1	–	0	4	–	4	–	1
Chadron Normal	2	–	1	–	0	4	–	2	–	1
Kearney Normal	5	–	2	–	1	5	–	2	–	1
Grand Island	4	–	2	–	1	?	–	?	–	?
Hastings	4	–	2	–	1	?	–	?	–	?
Doane	3	–	3	–	1	4	–	3	–	1
Cotner	2	–	4	–	1	0	–	8	–	0
Nebraska Central	2	–	5	–	0	?	–	?	–	?
Wayne Normal	1	–	4	–	0	1	–	6	–	0
York (NE)	0	–	6	–	0	0	–	6	–	0
$ – Conference champion

1923 Nebraska Intercollegiate Conference football standings
	Conf.					Overall
Team	W		L		T	W		L		T
Hastings $	7	–	0	–	0	?	–	?	–	?
Chadron Normal	4	–	0	–	1	7	–	0	–	1
Midland	7	–	1	–	1	8	–	2	–	1
Nebraska Wesleyan	4	–	1	–	1	6	–	1	–	2
Peru Normal	4	–	1	–	2	6	–	1	–	2
Grand Island	4	–	3	–	0	5	–	4	–	0
Doane	3	–	4	–	0	3	–	4	–	0
Kearney Normal	2	–	4	–	1	2	–	4	–	1
Wayne Normal	2	–	4	–	0	2	–	6	–	0
Nebraska Central	1	–	6	–	1	1	–	6	–	1
York (NE)	0	–	6	–	1	0	–	6	–	1
Cotner	0	–	8	–	0	0	–	8	–	0
$ – Conference champion

1924 Nebraska College Athletic Conference football standings
	Conf.					Overall
Team	W		L		T	W		L		T
Peru Normal $	6	–	0	–	0	8	–	0	–	0
Hastings	4	–	0	–	1	5	–	1	–	2
Chadron Normal	5	–	1	–	0	8	–	1	–	0
Grand Island	5	–	1	–	0	5	–	1	–	1
Midland	3	–	1	–	1	3	–	3	–	2
York (NE)	5	–	3	–	0	6	–	3	–	0
Kearney Normal	3	–	4	–	1	3	–	4	–	1
Cotner	2	–	4	–	0	3	–	5	–	0
Doane	1	–	6	–	1	1	–	6	–	1
Wayne Normal	1	–	6	–	0	1	–	6	–	1
Omaha	0	–	3	–	0	0	–	6	–	0
Nebraska Central	0	–	6	–	0	0	–	6	–	0
$ – Conference champion

1925 Nebraska College Athletic Conference football standings
	Conf.					Overall
Team	W		L		T	W		L		T
Chadron Normal $	6	–	0	–	0	9	–	0	–	0
Peru Normal	6	–	1	–	0	6	–	3	–	1
Midland	6	–	1	–	0	6	–	4	–	0
Omaha	2	–	1	–	1	3	–	3	–	1
Doane	5	–	3	–	0	5	–	3	–	0
Kearney Normal	4	–	3	–	0	4	–	5	–	0
Wayne Normal	3	–	3	–	0	4	–	4	–	0
Cotner	2	–	5	–	0	3	–	5	–	0
Hastings	1	–	4	–	1	1	–	5	–	1
Grand Island	1	–	4	–	3	1	–	4	–	3
Nebraska Central	1	–	5	–	1	1	–	5	–	1
York (NE)	0	–	7	–	0	0	–	7	–	0
$ – Conference champion

1926 Nebraska College Athletic Conference football standings
	Conf.					Overall
Team	W		L		T	W		L		T
Chadron Normal $	6	–	0	–	0	6	–	4	–	0
Peru Normal	5	–	1	–	1	7	–	1	–	1
Nebraska Wesleyan	4	–	1	–	0	6	–	4	–	0
Nebraska Central	3	–	1	–	2	?	–	?	–	?
Doane	5	–	2	–	1	5	–	2	–	2
Midland	4	–	3	–	0	5	–	4	–	0
Hastings	4	–	3	–	0	4	–	4	–	0
Wayne Normal	2	–	3	–	0	3	–	5	–	0
Kearney Normal	2	–	3	–	1	2	–	6	–	1
York (NE)	2	–	4	–	2	2	–	4	–	2
Grand Island	2	–	4	–	1	2	–	5	–	1
Omaha	0	–	5	–	0	2	–	5	–	0
Cotner	0	–	9	–	0	0	–	9	–	0
$ – Conference champion

1927 Nebraska College Athletic Conference football standings
	Conf.					Overall
Team	W		L		T	W		L		T
Peru Normal $	6	–	0	–	0	8	–	0	–	0
Doane	5	–	0	–	1	6	–	1	–	1
York (NE)	3	–	0	–	3	3	–	2	–	3
Chadron Normal	4	–	1	–	0	7	–	2	–	0
Kearney Normal	3	–	1	–	2	4	–	2	–	2
Nebraska Central	4	–	2	–	0	?	–	?	–	?
Midland	3	–	3	–	2	3	–	4	–	3
Cotner	2	–	4	–	0	?	–	?	–	?
Hastings	2	–	4	–	0	4	–	5	–	0
Grand Island	1	–	3	–	2	1	–	5	–	2
Wayne Normal	1	–	3	–	1	1	–	6	–	1
Omaha	1	–	5	–	0	3	–	6	–	0
Nebraska Wesleyan	0	–	4	–	1	0	–	8	–	1
Dana	0	–	5	–	0	0	–	7	–	0
$ – Conference champion

1928 Nebraska College Athletic Conference football standings
	Conf.					Overall
Team	W		L		T	W		L		T
Hastings $	5	–	0	–	1	7	–	1	–	1
Doane	3	–	1	–	1	4	–	2	–	1
Midland	3	–	1	–	2	5	–	1	–	2
Nebraska Wesleyan	2	–	1	–	2	5	–	2	–	2
Cotner	3	–	3	–	0	4	–	4	–	0
Grand Island	1	–	3	–	1	1	–	7	–	1
York (NE)	1	–	4	–	1	1	–	5	–	2
Nebraska Central	0	–	6	–	0	1	–	6	–	0
$ – Conference champion

1929 Nebraska College Athletic Conference football standings
	Conf.					Overall
Team	W		L		T	W		L		T
Cotner $	5	–	0	–	0	6	–	1	–	0
Doane	5	–	1	–	0	6	–	1	–	0
Hastings	3	–	2	–	0	5	–	4	–	0
Midland	3	–	2	–	0	4	–	4	–	2
Nebraska Wesleyan	2	–	3	–	0	3	–	5	–	1
Nebraska Central	1	–	3	–	1	?	–	?	–	?
York (NE)	1	–	4	–	0	2	–	5	–	0
Grand Island	0	–	5	–	1	0	–	6	–	2
$ – Conference champion

1930 Nebraska College Athletic Conference football standings
	Conf.					Overall
Team	W		L		T	W		L		T
Cotner $	5	–	1	–	0	6	–	1	–	1
Nebraska Wesleyan	4	–	1	–	0	6	–	3	–	0
Doane	3	–	2	–	0	4	–	3	–	0
Hastings	3	–	2	–	0	3	–	4	–	1
York (NE)	1	–	2	–	1	3	–	3	–	2
Midland	2	–	4	–	0	2	–	5	–	1
Grand Island	1	–	3	–	1	1	–	4	–	2
Nebraska Central	0	–	4	–	0	0	–	6	–	0
$ – Conference champion

1931 Nebraska College Athletic Conference football standings
	Conf.					Overall
Team	W		L		T	W		L		T
Nebraska Wesleyan $	4	–	0	–	1	4	–	3	–	1
Hastings	1	–	0	–	3	2	–	2	–	4
York (NE)	2	–	1	–	2	3	–	3	–	2
Cotner	2	–	3	–	0	3	–	4	–	0
Midland	1	–	2	–	2	1	–	5	–	2
Doane	0	–	4	–	0	1	–	6	–	1
$ – Conference champion

1932 Nebraska College Athletic Conference football standings
	Conf.					Overall
Team	W		L		T	W		L		T
Hastings +	4	–	0	–	1	5	–	2	–	1
Nebraska Wesleyan +	4	–	0	–	1	4	–	3	–	1
Midland	2	–	3	–	0	4	–	4	–	0
Cotner	2	–	3	–	0	4	–	5	–	0
Doane	1	–	3	–	1	3	–	4	–	1
York (NE)	0	–	4	–	1	1	–	5	–	1
+ – Conference co-champions

1933 Nebraska College Athletic Conference football standings
	Conf.					Overall
Team	W		L		T	W		L		T
Hastings $	3	–	0	–	1	4	–	2	–	1
Nebraska Wesleyan	3	–	1	–	0	3	–	5	–	1
Midland	2	–	2	–	0	3	–	4	–	0
York (NE)	0	–	2	–	2	4	–	4	–	2
Doane	0	–	3	–	1	1	–	5	–	2
$ – Conference champion

1934 Nebraska College Athletic Conference football standings
	Conf.					Overall
Team	W		L		T	W		L		T
Nebraska Wesleyan $	4	–	0	–	0	6	–	2	–	1
Hastings	3	–	1	–	0	7	–	2	–	0
Midland	2	–	2	–	0	3	–	4	–	0
Doane	1	–	3	–	0	3	–	5	–	0
York (NE)	0	–	4	–	0	5	–	5	–	0
$ – Conference champion

1935 Nebraska College Athletic Conference football standings
	Conf.					Overall
Team	W		L		T	W		L		T
Hastings $	3	–	1	–	0	6	–	4	–	0
Nebraska Wesleyan	2	–	1	–	1	5	–	3	–	1
Doane	2	–	2	–	0	0	–	6	–	3
Midland	1	–	2	–	1	2	–	2	–	3
York (NE)	1	–	3	–	0	6	–	4	–	0
$ – Conference champion

1936 Nebraska College Athletic Conference football standings
	Conf.					Overall
Team	W		L		T	W		L		T
Hastings $	4	–	0	–	0	8	–	1	–	0
Nebraska Wesleyan	3	–	1	–	0	5	–	3	–	0
Midland	2	–	2	–	0	5	–	3	–	0
York (NE)	1	–	3	–	0	6	–	3	–	0
Doane	0	–	4	–	0	0	–	5	–	2
$ – Conference champion

1937 Nebraska College Athletic Conference football standings
	Conf.					Overall
Team	W		L		T	W		L		T
Hastings $	2	–	0	–	1	6	–	2	–	1
Doane	2	–	1	–	0	6	–	1	–	1
Midland	1	–	1	–	1	5	–	1	–	2
Nebraska Wesleyan	0	–	3	–	0	2	–	5	–	1
$ – Conference champion

1938 Nebraska College Athletic Conference football standings
	Conf.					Overall
Team	W		L		T	W		L		T
Midland +	3	–	1	–	0	6	–	3	–	0
Doane +	3	–	1	–	0	5	–	3	–	0
Hastings	2	–	1	–	1	5	–	3	–	2
Nebraska Wesleyan	1	–	2	–	1	4	–	4	–	1
York (NE)	0	–	4	–	0	2	–	6	–	0
+ – Conference co-champions

1939 Nebraska College Athletic Conference football standings
	Conf.					Overall
Team	W		L		T	W		L		T
Hastings *	3	–	0	–	1	6	–	3	–	1
Midland	2	–	0	–	2	4	–	1	–	4
Doane	2	–	2	–	0	4	–	4	–	0
Nebraska Wesleyan	1	–	3	–	0	2	–	7	–	0
York (NE)	0	–	3	–	1	2	–	4	–	3
* The conference title was declared vacant after the season because Hastings used an ineligible player.

1940 Nebraska College Athletic Conference football standings
	Conf.					Overall
Team	W		L		T	W		L		T
Doane +	3	–	0	–	1	5	–	2	–	1
Hastings +	3	–	0	–	1	4	–	4	–	1
Midland	2	–	2	–	0	3	–	6	–	0
Nebraska Wesleyan	1	–	3	–	0	1	–	7	–	0
York (NE)	0	–	4	–	0	1	–	8	–	0
+ – Conference co-champions

1941 Nebraska College Athletic Conference football standings
	Conf.					Overall
Team	W		L		T	W		L		T
Midland $	4	–	0	–	0	9	–	0	–	0
Doane	2	–	1	–	1	5	–	2	–	1
Nebraska Wesleyan	2	–	2	–	0	2	–	6	–	1
Hastings	1	–	2	–	1	1	–	6	–	1
York (NE)	0	–	4	–	0	1	–	7	–	0
$ – Conference champion

1942 Nebraska College Athletic Conference football standings
	Conf.					Overall
Team	W		L		T	W		L		T
Doane $	4	–	0	–	0	5	–	3	–	0
Nebraska Wesleyan	3	–	1	–	0	5	–	3	–	1
York (NE)	1	–	3	–	0	3	–	4	–	0
Midland	1	–	3	–	0	2	–	5	–	1
Hastings	1	–	3	–	0	1	–	8	–	0
$ – Conference champion

1946 Nebraska College Conference football standings
	Conf.					Overall
Team	W		L		T	W		L		T
Doane $	5	–	0	–	1	6	–	2	–	1
Nebraska Wesleyan	5	–	0	–	2	7	–	1	–	3
Kearney State	5	–	2	–	1	6	–	2	–	1
Peru State	4	–	3	–	1	4	–	4	–	1
Midland	3	–	4	–	0	4	–	4	–	0
Wayne State (NE)	2	–	3	–	0	4	–	3	–	0
Hastings	1	–	4	–	1	1	–	6	–	1
Chadron State	1	–	5	–	0	3	–	7	–	0
York (NE)	0	–	6	–	0	3	–	6	–	0
$ – Conference champion

1947 Nebraska College Conference football standings
	Conf.					Overall
Team	W		L		T	W		L		T
Chadron State +	5	–	1	–	1	7	–	1	–	1
Nebraska Wesleyan +	5	–	1	–	1	7	–	1	–	1
Hastings	5	–	2	–	1	6	–	2	–	1
Doane	4	–	2	–	1	6	–	2	–	1
Kearney State	4	–	3	–	1	6	–	3	–	1
Peru State	3	–	3	–	2	3	–	4	–	2
Midland	1	–	4	–	2	2	–	5	–	2
Wayne State (NE)	0	–	4	–	3	0	–	4	–	3
York (NE)	0	–	7	–	0	2	–	7	–	0
+ – Conference co-champions

1948 Nebraska College Conference football standings
	Conf.					Overall
Team	W		L		T	W		L		T
Wayne State (NE) +	6	–	1	–	0	8	–	1	–	0
Chadron State +	6	–	1	–	0	7	–	1	–	0
Nebraska Wesleyan	5	–	2	–	0	6	–	3	–	0
Doane	4	–	2	–	0	5	–	4	–	0
Kearney State	3	–	3	–	0	5	–	3	–	0
Peru State	3	–	3	–	0	4	–	4	–	0
Hastings	1	–	5	–	0	2	–	7	–	0
York (NE)	0	–	5	–	0	2	–	6	–	0
Midland	0	–	6	–	0	0	–	10	–	0
+ – Conference co-champions

1949 Nebraska College Conference football standings
	Conf.					Overall
Team	W		L		T	W		L		T
Wayne State (NE) $	8	–	0	–	0	9	–	0	–	0
Chadron State	6	–	2	–	0	7	–	3	–	0
Doane	5	–	2	–	0	5	–	4	–	0
Kearney State	3	–	3	–	1	5	–	3	–	1
Hastings	3	–	3	–	1	4	–	3	–	1
Nebraska Wesleyan	4	–	4	–	0	4	–	5	–	0
Peru State	2	–	5	–	0	4	–	5	–	0
York (NE)	0	–	6	–	0	2	–	7	–	0
Midland	0	–	6	–	0	1	–	7	–	0
$ – Conference champion

1950 Nebraska College Conference football standings
	Conf.					Overall
Team	W		L		T	W		L		T
Doane $	4	–	1	–	1	7	–	2	–	1
Peru State	5	–	2	–	0	7	–	2	–	0
Wayne State (NE)	5	–	2	–	0	6	–	3	–	0
Hastings	4	–	2	–	1	5	–	2	–	1
Chadron State	4	–	2	–	1	5	–	4	–	1
Nebraska Wesleyan	4	–	3	–	0	5	–	5	–	0
Kearney State	3	–	5	–	0	4	–	5	–	0
Midland	1	–	6	–	1	2	–	6	–	1
York (NE)	0	–	7	–	0	1	–	9	–	0
$ – Conference champion

1951 Nebraska College Conference football standings
	Conf.					Overall
Team	W		L		T	W		L		T
Peru State +	6	–	1	–	0	8	–	2	–	0
Doane +	6	–	1	–	0	7	–	2	–	0
Wayne State (NE)	5	–	2	–	0	6	–	3	–	0
Kearney State	4	–	3	–	0	5	–	3	–	0
Hastings	4	–	3	–	0	5	–	4	–	0
Nebraska Wesleyan	2	–	5	–	0	2	–	8	–	0
Chadron State	1	–	6	–	0	1	–	8	–	0
Midland	0	–	7	–	0	1	–	7	–	0
+ – Conference co-champions

1952 Nebraska College Conference football standings
	Conf.					Overall
Team	W		L		T	W		L		T
Peru State $	7	–	0	–	0	10	–	0	–	0
Hastings	5	–	2	–	0	6	–	2	–	0
Doane	4	–	3	–	0	4	–	5	–	0
Nebraska Wesleyan	4	–	3	–	0	5	–	5	–	0
Kearney State	3	–	4	–	0	5	–	4	–	0
Wayne State (NE)	3	–	4	–	0	4	–	5	–	0
Chadron State	2	–	5	–	0	3	–	6	–	0
Midland	0	–	7	–	0	2	–	7	–	0
$ – Conference champion

1953 Nebraska College Conference football standings
	Conf.					Overall
Team	W		L		T	W		L		T
Peru State $	6	–	0	–	0	8	–	0	–	0
Wayne State (NE)	4	–	2	–	1	5	–	3	–	1
Kearney State	3	–	2	–	1	3	–	5	–	1
Doane	3	–	2	–	2	4	–	3	–	2
Midland	4	–	3	–	0	5	–	4	–	0
Hastings	3	–	4	–	0	4	–	5	–	0
Nebraska Wesleyan	1	–	4	–	2	2	–	4	–	3
Chadron State	0	–	7	–	0	1	–	7	–	0
$ – Conference champion

1954 Nebraska College Conference football standings
	Conf.					Overall
Team	W		L		T	W		L		T
Hastings $	7	–	0	–	0	9	–	0	–	0
Peru State	5	–	2	–	0	7	–	2	–	0
Kearney State	4	–	2	–	1	5	–	3	–	1
Midland	3	–	4	–	0	4	–	4	–	0
Wayne State (NE)	3	–	4	–	0	5	–	4	–	0
Doane	2	–	5	–	0	2	–	7	–	0
Nebraska Wesleyan	2	–	4	–	1	3	–	6	–	1
Chadron State	1	–	6	–	0	1	–	7	–	0
$ – Conference champion; Doane forfeited a conference win over Midland.

1955 Nebraska College Conference football standings
	Conf.					Overall
Team	W		L		T	W		L		T
Kearney State $	6	–	1	–	0	8	–	2	–	0
Hastings	5	–	1	–	1	5	–	4	–	1
Peru State	5	–	2	–	0	7	–	2	–	0
Wayne State (NE)	4	–	3	–	0	4	–	4	–	1
Doane	3	–	4	–	0	3	–	4	–	1
Nebraska Wesleyan	2	–	4	–	1	2	–	7	–	1
Chadron State	2	–	5	–	0	3	–	5	–	0
Midland	0	–	7	–	0	0	–	8	–	0
$ – Conference champion

=== NAIA (1956–1969) ===
1956 Nebraska College Conference football standings
	Conf.					Overall
Team	W		L		T	W		L		T
Kearney State $	7	–	0	–	0	9	–	0	–	0
Hastings	5	–	1	–	0	5	–	2	–	0
Peru State	5	–	2	–	0	6	–	3	–	0
Chadron State	3	–	2	–	1	5	–	2	–	1
Nebraska Wesleyan	3	–	4	–	0	3	–	7	–	0
Doane	2	–	4	–	1	4	–	4	–	1
Midland	1	–	6	–	0	2	–	6	–	0
Wayne State (NE)	0	–	7	–	0	1	–	8	–	0
$ – Conference champion

1957 Nebraska College Conference football standings
	Conf.					Overall
Team	W		L		T	W		L		T
Hastings $	7	–	0	–	0	7	–	2	–	0
Peru State	6	–	1	–	0	7	–	2	–	0
Doane	5	–	2	–	0	6	–	2	–	0
Kearney State	4	–	3	–	0	6	–	3	–	0
Nebraska Wesleyan	3	–	4	–	0	3	–	5	–	0
Chadron State	1	–	6	–	0	2	–	6	–	0
Midland	1	–	5	–	1	3	–	5	–	1
Wayne State (NE)	0	–	6	–	1	1	–	7	–	1
$ – Conference champion; Kearney State forfeited conference wins over Peru State and Doane.

1958 Nebraska College Conference football standings
	Conf.					Overall
Team	W		L		T	W		L		T
Kearney State +	7	–	0	–	0	9	–	0	–	0
Chadron State +	7	–	0	–	0	8	–	0	–	0
Peru State	6	–	1	–	0	7	–	1	–	0
Nebraska Wesleyan	5	–	3	–	0	5	–	4	–	0
Hastings	4	–	3	–	0	4	–	4	–	0
Wayne State (NE)	4	–	4	–	0	4	–	5	–	0
Doane	3	–	6	–	0	3	–	6	–	0
Concordia (NE)	1	–	7	–	0	2	–	7	–	0
Midland	1	–	7	–	0	1	–	7	–	0
Dana	0	–	7	–	0	0	–	8	–	0
+ – Conference co-champions

1959 Nebraska College Conference football standings
	Conf.					Overall
Team	W		L		T	W		L		T
Kearney State $	7	–	0	–	0	8	–	2	–	0
Peru State	6	–	1	–	0	7	–	1	–	0
Chadron State	5	–	2	–	0	6	–	2	–	0
Doane	5	–	3	–	1	5	–	3	–	1
Nebraska Wesleyan	4	–	3	–	1	5	–	3	–	1
Wayne State (NE)	4	–	3	–	1	4	–	4	–	1
Hastings	2	–	2	–	3	3	–	2	–	3
Concordia (NE)	2	–	6	–	0	3	–	6	–	0
Dana	0	–	7	–	0	0	–	8	–	0
Midland	0	–	8	–	0	0	–	9	–	0
$ – Conference champion

1960 Nebraska College Conference football standings
	Conf.					Overall
Team	W		L		T	W		L		T
Peru State $	5	–	1	–	0	6	–	2	–	1
Hastings	4	–	2	–	0	5	–	4	–	0
Wayne State (NE)	4	–	2	–	0	5	–	4	–	0
Kearney State	4	–	2	–	0	4	–	5	–	0
Doane	2	–	4	–	0	4	–	5	–	0
Chadron State	2	–	4	–	0	3	–	5	–	0
Nebraska Wesleyan	0	–	6	–	0	0	–	8	–	0
$ – Conference champion

1961 Nebraska College Conference football standings
	Conf.					Overall
Team	W		L		T	W		L		T
Peru State $	5	–	0	–	1	7	–	1	–	1
Kearney State	4	–	2	–	0	7	–	2	–	0
Hastings	3	–	2	–	1	4	–	4	–	1
Doane	2	–	2	–	2	5	–	2	–	2
Wayne State (NE)	3	–	3	–	0	4	–	5	–	0
Chadron State	2	–	4	–	0	3	–	6	–	0
Nebraska Wesleyan	0	–	6	–	0	0	–	9	–	0
$ – Conference champion

1962 Nebraska College Conference football standings
	Conf.					Overall
Team	W		L		T	W		L		T
Kearney State $	4	–	0	–	1	6	–	1	–	1
Peru State	2	–	1	–	2	5	–	2	–	2
Wayne State (NE)	3	–	2	–	0	5	–	3	–	0
Hastings	2	–	2	–	1	5	–	2	–	1
Doane	1	–	4	–	0	2	–	5	–	1
Chadron State	1	–	4	–	0	2	–	7	–	0
$ – Conference champion

1963 Nebraska College Conference football standings
	Conf.					Overall
Team	W		L		T	W		L		T
No. 3 Kearney State $^	5	–	0	–	0	9	–	1	–	0
Hastings	3	–	1	–	1	5	–	3	–	1
Wayne State (NE)	3	–	2	–	0	4	–	5	–	0
Doane	2	–	3	–	0	3	–	6	–	0
Peru State	1	–	3	–	1	3	–	5	–	1
Chadron State	0	–	5	–	0	1	–	7	–	0
$ – Conference champion; ^ – NAIA playoff participant; Rankings from NAIA poll

1964 Nebraska College Conference football standings
	Conf.					Overall
Team	W		L		T	W		L		T
No. 12 Kearney State $	4	–	0	–	0	7	–	1	–	0
Wayne State (NE)	3	–	1	–	0	6	–	2	–	0
Hastings	2	–	2	–	0	6	–	3	–	0
Peru State	1	–	3	–	0	2	–	7	–	0
Chadron State	0	–	4	–	0	1	–	7	–	0
$ – Conference champion; Rankings from NAIA poll

1965 Nebraska College Conference football standings
	Conf.					Overall
Team	W		L		T	W		L		T
Kearney State +	3	–	1	–	0	7	–	2	–	0
Wayne State (NE) +	3	–	1	–	0	6	–	4	–	0
Peru State +	3	–	1	–	0	4	–	5	–	0
Hastings	1	–	3	–	0	4	–	6	–	0
Chadron State	0	–	4	–	0	2	–	6	–	1
+ – Conference co-champions

1966 Nebraska College Conference football standings
	Conf.					Overall
Team	W		L		T	W		L		T
Wayne State (NE) $	4	–	0	–	0	6	–	2	–	0
No. 20 Kearney State	3	–	1	–	0	8	–	2	–	0
Hastings	2	–	2	–	0	3	–	4	–	1
Peru State	1	–	3	–	0	2	–	7	–	0
Chadron State	0	–	4	–	0	0	–	9	–	0
$ – Conference champion; Rankings from NAIA poll

1967 Nebraska College Conference football standings
	Conf.					Overall
Team	W		L		T	W		L		T
No. 6 Kearney State $	4	–	0	–	0	9	–	0	–	0
Wayne State (NE)	3	–	1	–	0	6	–	4	–	0
Chadron State	2	–	2	–	0	3	–	6	–	0
Peru State	1	–	3	–	0	1	–	7	–	1
Hastings	0	–	4	–	0	2	–	8	–	0
$ – Conference champion; Rankings from NAIA poll

1968 Nebraska College Conference football standings
	Conf.					Overall
Team	W		L		T	W		L		T
Kearney State $	4	–	0	–	0	5	–	4	–	0
Chadron State	3	–	1	–	0	8	–	1	–	0
Wayne State (NE)	2	–	2	–	0	3	–	5	–	0
Hastings	1	–	3	–	0	3	–	6	–	0
Peru State	0	–	4	–	0	2	–	6	–	0
$ – Conference champion

1969 Nebraska College Conference football standings
	Conf.					Overall
Team	W		L		T	W		L		T
Kearney State $	2	–	0	–	1	5	–	3	–	1
Chadron State	2	–	1	–	0	6	–	3	–	0
Wayne State (NE)	1	–	1	–	1	5	–	3	–	1
Peru State	0	–	3	–	0	0	–	9	–	0
$ – Conference champion

=== NAIA Division I (1970–1976) ===
1970 Nebraska College Conference football standings
	Conf.					Overall
Team	W		L		T	W		L		T
No. 16 Wayne State (NE) $	3	–	0	–	0	7	–	3	–	0
Kearney State	2	–	1	–	0	8	–	2	–	0
Chadron State	1	–	2	–	0	5	–	4	–	0
Peru State	0	–	3	–	0	2	–	8	–	0
$ – Conference champion; Rankings from NAIA Division II poll

1971 Nebraska College Conference football standings
	Conf.					Overall
Team	W		L		T	W		L		T
Wayne State (NE) $	3	–	0	–	0	4	–	5	–	0
Kearney State	2	–	1	–	0	5	–	3	–	1
Chadron State	1	–	2	–	0	5	–	4	–	0
Peru State	0	–	3	–	0	1	–	9	–	0
$ – Conference champion

1972 Nebraska College Conference football standings
	Conf.					Overall
Team	W		L		T	W		L		T
Kearney State $	3	–	0	–	0	8	–	2	–	0
Chadron State	2	–	1	–	0	8	–	2	–	0
Wayne State (NE)	1	–	2	–	0	3	–	7	–	0
Peru State	0	–	3	–	0	3	–	7	–	0
$ – Conference champion

1973 Nebraska College Conference football standings
	Conf.					Overall
Team	W		L		T	W		L		T
Kearney State +	2	–	1	–	0	6	–	3	–	0
Peru State +	2	–	1	–	0	5	–	5	–	0
Wayne State (NE)	1	–	2	–	0	6	–	2	–	1
Chadron State	1	–	2	–	0	7	–	3	–	0
+ – Conference co-champions

1974 Nebraska College Conference football standings
	Conf.					Overall
Team	W		L		T	W		L		T
Kearney State $	3	–	0	–	0	7	–	2	–	0
Chadron State	2	–	1	–	0	6	–	3	–	0
Wayne State (NE)	1	–	2	–	0	4	–	6	–	0
Peru State	0	–	3	–	0	4	–	6	–	0
$ – Conference champion

1975 Nebraska College Conference football standings
	Conf.					Overall
Team	W		L		T	W		L		T
Kearney State $	3	–	0	–	0	6	–	3	–	0
Chadron State	2	–	1	–	0	6	–	3	–	0
Wayne State (NE)	1	–	2	–	0	5	–	5	–	0
Peru State	0	–	3	–	0	4	–	6	–	0
$ – Conference champion

1976 Nebraska College Conference football standings
	Conf.					Overall
Team	W		L		T	W		L		T
No. 7 Kearney State $	3	–	0	–	0	9	–	1	–	0
Chadron State	1	–	2	–	0	4	–	6	–	0
Peru State	1	–	2	–	0	3	–	7	–	0
Wayne State (NE)	1	–	2	–	0	3	–	8	–	0
$ – Conference champion; Rankings from NAIA Division I poll
