= 1941 Kearney State Antelopes football team =

American college football season

1941 Kearney State Antelopes football

NIAA champion
- Conference: Nebraska Intercollegiate Athletic Association
- Record: 8–0 (3–0 NIAA)
- Head coach: L. F. "Pop" Klein (7th season)

1941 Nebraska Intercollegiate Athletic Association football standings
	Conf.					Overall
Team	W		L		T	W		L		T
Kearney State $	3	–	0	–	0	8	–	0	–	0
Wayne State (NE)	1	–	1	–	1	4	–	2	–	2
Peru State	1	–	1	–	1	4	–	3	–	1
Chadron State	0	–	3	–	0	3	–	4	–	0
$ – Conference champion

The 1941 Kearney State Antelopes football team was an American football team that represented Kearney State Teachers College (later renamed University of Nebraska at Kearney) as a member of the Nebraska Intercollegiate Athletic Association (NIAA) during the 1941 college football season. In their seventh season under head coach L. F. "Pop" Klein, the Antelopes compiled a perfect 8–0 record (3–0 against NIAA opponents), won the NIAA championship, shut out six of eight opponents, and outscored all opponents by a total of 204 to 13.

The 1941 season was one of four perfect seasons in the history of the Kearney football program, along with the 1956, 1958, and 1967 seasons.

== Schedule ==
Date	Opponent	Site	Result	Attendance	Source
September 19	Bethany (KS)*	Kearney, NE	W 26–0		
September 26	at York*	Kearney, KS	W 51–0		
October 3	at Hastings*	Hastings, NE	W 18–0		
October 11	at Peru State	Peru, NE	W 13–7		
October 17	Nebraska Wesleyan*	Kearney, NE	W 32–0		
October 22	Sterling*	College Field; Kearney, NE	W 23–0	1,500	
October 31	at Chadron State	Chadron, NE	W 13–6		
November 7	Wayne State (NE)	Kearney, NE	W 28–0	2,000	
*Non-conference game
