= Alfred G. Wheeler =

American football and basketball player and coach (1899–1982)

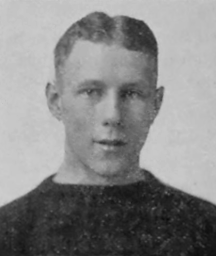

Biographical details
- Born: March 2, 1899; Oberlin, Ohio, U.S.
- Died: June 16, 1982 (aged 83); North Carolina, U.S.
- Education: Columbia

Playing career

Football
- 1918–1921: Oberlin

Basketball
- 1918–1922: Oberlin
- Position: Quarterback

Coaching career (HC unless noted)

Football
- 1925–1926: Iowa State (assistant)
- 1927–1928: Amherst (assistant)
- 1929–1931: Amherst
- 1938–1960: Peru State

Basketball
- 1927–1932: Amherst
- 1938–1946: Peru State

Head coaching record
- Overall: 140–65–15 (football)

Accomplishments and honors

Championships
- Football; 2 NIAA (1939–1940); 4 NCC (1951–1953, 1960)

Alfred George Wheeler (March 2, 1899 – June 16, 1982) was an American college football and college basketball player and coach. He served as the head football and men's basketball coach at Amherst College in Amherst, Massachusetts, before serving in the same roles at Peru State College in Peru, Nebraska

As a college athlete at Oberlin College, he quarterbacked his team to a 1921 victory over Ohio State. He died on June 16, 1982 at Charlotte Memorial Hospitial.

== Head coaching record ==
=== Football ===
Year	Team	Overall	Conference	Standing	Bowl/playoffs
Amherst Lord Jeffs (Little Three) (1929–1931)
1929	Amherst	5–2–1	1–1		
1930	Amherst	4–2–2	0–1–1		
1931	Amherst	2–5	0–2	3rd	
Amherst:		11–9–3	1–4–1		
Peru State Bobcats (Nebraska Intercollegiate Athletic Association) (1938–1942)
1938	Peru State	1–7	0–2	T–3rd	
1939	Peru State	7–1–1	3–0	1st	
1940	Peru State	7–0–2	2–0–1	1st	
1941	Peru State	4–3–1	1–1–1	T–2nd	
1942	Peru State	6–2–1	1–1–1	T–2nd	
Peru State Bobcats (Nebraska College Conference) (1943–1960)
1943	Peru State	3–3–2			
1944	Peru State	2–5			
1945	Peru State	4–1–1			
1946	Peru State	4–4–1	4–3–1	4th	
1947	Peru State	3–4–2	3–3–2	6th	
1948	Peru State	4–4	3–3	T–5th	
1949	Peru State	4–5	2–5	7th	
1950	Peru State	7–2	5–2	T–2nd	
1951	Peru State	8–2	6–1	T–1st	
1952	Peru State	10–0	7–0	1st	
1953	Peru State	8–0	6–0	1st	
1954	Peru State	7–2	5–2	2nd	
1955	Peru State	7–2	5–2	3rd	
1956	Peru State	6–3	5–2	3rd	
1957	Peru State	7–2	6–1	2nd	
1958	Peru State	7–1	6–1	3rd	
1959	Peru State	7–1	6–1	2nd	
1960	Peru State	6–2–1	5–1	1st	
Peru State:		129–56–12			
Total:		140–65–15			
National championship Conference title Conference division title or championship game berth
