= 1952 Peru State Bobcats football team =

American college football season

1952 Peru State Bobcats football

NCC champion
- Conference: Nebraska College Conference
- Record: 10–0 (7–0 NCC)
- Head coach: Alfred G. Wheeler (15th season)
- Home stadium: Oak Bowl

1952 Nebraska College Conference football standings
	Conf.					Overall
Team	W		L		T	W		L		T
Peru State $	7	–	0	–	0	10	–	0	–	0
Hastings	5	–	2	–	0	6	–	2	–	0
Doane	4	–	3	–	0	4	–	5	–	0
Nebraska Wesleyan	4	–	3	–	0	5	–	5	–	0
Kearney State	3	–	4	–	0	5	–	4	–	0
Wayne State (NE)	3	–	4	–	0	4	–	5	–	0
Chadron State	2	–	5	–	0	3	–	6	–	0
Midland	0	–	7	–	0	2	–	7	–	0
$ – Conference champion

The 1952 Peru State Bobcats football team was an American football team that represented Peru State College as a member of the Nebraska College Conference (NCC) during the 1952 college football season. In their 15th year under head coach Alfred G. Wheeler, the Pioneers compiled a 10–0 record (7–0 against conference opponents), won the NCC championship, and outscored opponents by a total of 307 to 89. The 1952 season was part of a 26-game winning streak that began on November 3, 1951, and ended on October 15, 1954, and included consecutive perfect seasons in 1952 and 1953. The team played its home games at the Oak Bowl in Peru, Nebraska.

== Schedule ==
Date	Opponent	Site	Result	Source
September 12	at Washburn*	Topeka, KS	W 43–21	
September 19	at Central (IA)*	Pella, IA	W 27–0	
September 27	at Hastings	Hastings field; Hastings, NE	W 14–6	
October 3	Chadron State	Oak Bowl; Peru, NE	W 47–7	
October 10	at Nebraska Wesleyan	Lincoln, NE	W 27–7	
October 18	Midland^{†}	Oak Bowl; Peru, NE	W 40–7	
October 24	vs. Doane	Nebraska City, NE	W 13–7	
October 31	at Wayne State (NE)	Wayne, NE	W 56–7	
November 7	Kearney State	Oak Bowl; Peru, NE	W 13–7	
November 11	vs. Augustana (SD)*	North Platte, NE	W 27–21	
*Non-conference game; ^{†}Homecoming
