= Fred Fulmer =

American football and basketball coach

Coaching career (HC unless noted)

Football
- 1922–1929: Kearney Normal

Basketball
- 1922–1930: Kearney Normal
- 1933–1935: Nebraska–Kearney

Head coaching record
- Overall: 28–31–9 (football); 96–52 (basketball)

Accomplishments and honors

Awards
- Nebraska–Kearney Hall of Fame (1980)

Fred Fulmer was an American football and basketball coach. He was the head football coach at Nebraska State Teachers College—now known as the University of Nebraska at Kearney–from 1922 to 1929, compiling a record of 28–31–9. He was also the head men's basketball coach from 1922 to 1930 and again from 1933 to 1935, compiling a 96–52 record.

== Head coaching record ==
Year	Team	Overall	Conference	Standing	Bowl/playoffs
Kearney Normal Antelopes (Nebraska College Athletic Conference) (1922–1927)
1922	Kearney Normal	5–2–1			
1923	Kearney Normal	1–4–2			
1924	Kearney Normal	3–4–1	3–4–1	7th	
1925	Kearney Normal	4–5	4–3	6th	
1926	Kearney Normal	2–6–1	2–3–1	T–8th	
1927	Kearney Normal	4–2–2	3–1—2	5th	
Kearney Normal Antelopes (Nebraska Intercollegiate Athletic Association) (1928–1929)
1928	Kearney Normal	5–4	1–1	T–3rd	
1929	Kearney Normal	2–7–1	0–3–1	5th	
Kearney Normal:		28–31–9			
Total:		28–31–9			
