= 1961 Peru State Bobcats football team =

American college football season

1961 Peru State Bobcats football

NCC champion
- Conference: Nebraska College Conference
- Record: 7–1–1 (5–0–1 NCC)
- Head coach: Jack McIntire (1st season)
- Home stadium: Oak Bowl

1961 Nebraska College Conference football standings
	Conf.					Overall
Team	W		L		T	W		L		T
Peru State $	5	–	0	–	1	7	–	1	–	1
Kearney State	4	–	2	–	0	7	–	2	–	0
Hastings	3	–	2	–	1	4	–	4	–	1
Doane	2	–	2	–	2	5	–	2	–	2
Wayne State (NE)	3	–	3	–	0	4	–	5	–	0
Chadron State	2	–	4	–	0	3	–	6	–	0
Nebraska Wesleyan	0	–	6	–	0	0	–	9	–	0
$ – Conference champion

The 1961 Peru State Bobcats football team was an American football team that represented Peru State Teachers College (now known as Peru State College) as a member of the Nebraska College Conference (NCC) during the 1961 college football season. In their first year under head coach Jack McIntire, the Pioneers compiled a 7–1–1 record (5–0–1 in conference games), won the NCC championship, and outscored opponents by a total of 141 to 89.

The team played its home games at the Oak Bowl in Peru, Nebraska.

== Schedule ==
Date	Opponent	Site	Result	Attendance	Source
September 9	vs. Iowa Wesleyan*	Hayward Field; Nebraska City, NE	W 15–0		
September 16	at St. Mary of the Plains*	Dodge City, KS	W 20–12		
September 23	Kearney State	Oak Bowl; Peru, NE	W 7–0		
September 30	at Hastings	A.H. Jones Stadium; Hastings, NE	W 14–0		
October 7	Doane	Oak Bowl; Peru, NE	T 0–0		
October 14	at Chadron State	Elliott Field; Chadron, NE	W 42–7		
October 21	at Nebraska Wesleyan	O.N. Magee Memorial Stadium; Lincoln, NE	W 16–7		
October 27	Wayne State (NE)	Oak Bowl; Peru, NE	W 27–7		
November 4	Panhandle A&M*	Oak Bowl; Peru, NE	L 0–56		
*Non-conference game
