= Del Stoltenberg =

American football and track and field coach (1935–2017)

Biographical details
- Born: April 17, 1935; Nebraska City, Nebraska, U.S.
- Died: June 3, 2017 (aged 82); Lincoln, Nebraska, U.S.

Playing career

Football
- 1953–1956: Peru State

Football
- ?–1957: Peru State
- Position: Halfback (football)

Coaching career (HC unless noted)

Football
- 1957: South Sioux City HS (NE) (backfield)
- 1958–1964: Scribner HS (NE)
- 1965: Wayne State (NE) (DB)
- 1966–1968: Grand Island Senior HS (NE)
- 1969–1982: Wayne State (NE)

Track and field
- 1957–1958: South Sioux City HS (NE)
- 1958–1965: Scribner HS (NE)

Head coaching record
- Overall: 62–70–5 (college football); 61–27–4 (high school football)
- Bowls: 0–1

Accomplishments and honors

Championships
- Football; 2 NCC (1970–1971)

Awards
- Football; 2× All-NCC (1955–1956)

Delbert Adolph Stoltenberg (April 17, 1935 – June 3, 2017) was an American football and track and field coach. He served as the head football coach at Wayne State College in Wayne, Nebraska from 1969 to 1982, compiling a record of 62–70–5.

A native of Nebraska City, Nebraska, Stoltenberg played college football as a halfback at Peru State Teachers College—now known as Peru State College—in Peru, Nebraska. He was named All-Nebraska College Conference (NCC) during his junior and senior seasons, 1955 and 1956. Stoltenberg also competed on the Peru State track and field team as a sprinter.

After graduating from Peru State in 1957, Stoltenberg began his coaching career at South Sioux City High School in South Sioux City, Nebraska when he was hired as head track coach and backfield coach for the football team. A year later, he resigned to become head coach in football and track at Scribner High School in Scribner, Nebraska. Stoltenberg led his football teams at Scribner to a record of 45–16–4 and five Cornhusker Conference titles in seven seasons, from 1958 to 1964. His track teams also won three Cornhusker Conference championships. In 1965, Stoltenberg served as backfield coach at Wayne State while working toward a master's degree. From 1966 to 1968, Stoltenberg was the head football coach at Grand Island Senior High School in Grand Island, Nebraska. His Grand Island football teams had records of 3–6 in 1966, 7–2 in 1967, and 6–3 in 1968.

Stoltenberg died on June 3, 2017, at a care center in Lincoln, Nebraska.

== Head coaching record ==
=== College football ===
Year	Team	Overall	Conference	Standing	Bowl/playoffs	NAIA^{#}
Wayne State Wildcats (Nebraska College Conference) (1969–1976)
1969	Wayne State	5–3–1	1–1–1	3rd		
1970	Wayne State	7–3	3–0	1st	L Mineral Water	16
1971	Wayne State	4–5	3–0	1st		
1972	Wayne State	3–7	1–2	3rd		
1973	Wayne State	6–2–1	1–2	T–3rd		
1974	Wayne State	4–6	1–2	3rd		
1975	Wayne State	5–5	1–2	3rd		
1976	Wayne State	3–8	1–2	T–2nd		
Wayne State Wildcats (Central States Intercollegiate Conference) (1977–1982)
1977	Wayne State	7–3	5–2	2nd		
1978	Wayne State	4–4–2	3–2–2	T–4th		
1979	Wayne State	4–5–1	3–4	T–3rd		
1980	Wayne State	4–5	3–4	6th		
1981	Wayne State	4–6	2–5	T–6th		
1982	Wayne State	2–8	1–6	T–6th		
Wayne State:		62–70–5	29–34–3			
Total:		62–70–5				
National championship Conference title Conference division title or championship game berth
^{#}Rankings from final NAIA Division II poll.
