= 1967 Kearney State Antelopes football team =

American college football season

1967 Kearney State Antelopes football

NCC champion
- Conference: Nebraska College Conference
- Record: 9–0 (4–0 NCC)
- Head coach: Allen H. Zikmund (13th season)

1967 Nebraska College Conference football standings
	Conf.					Overall
Team	W		L		T	W		L		T
No. 6 Kearney State $	4	–	0	–	0	9	–	0	–	0
Wayne State (NE)	3	–	1	–	0	6	–	4	–	0
Chadron State	2	–	2	–	0	3	–	6	–	0
Peru State	1	–	3	–	0	1	–	7	–	1
Hastings	0	–	4	–	0	2	–	8	–	0
$ – Conference champion; Rankings from NAIA poll

The 1967 Kearney Antelopes football team was an American football team that represented Kearney State College (later renamed University of Nebraska at Kearney) a member of the Nebraska College Conference (NCC) during the 1967 NAIA football season. In their 13th season under head coach Allen H. Zikmund, the Antelopes compiled a perfect 9–0 record (4–0 against NCC opponents), and outscored opponents by a total of 388 to 68.

The 1967 season was one of four perfect seasons in the history of the Kearney football program, along with the 1941, 1956, and 1958 seasons.

Nine Kearney players were selected as first-team players on the 1967 All-NCC football team. They were: quarterback Richard Osentowski; halfback Lannie Shelmadine; fullback Dave Aspegren; offensive end Gary Thompson; offensive tackle Ron Hadwiger; offensive guard Dale Naprstek; defensive end Robert Rasmussen; linebacker Lee Jacobsen; and defensive halfback Ron Laux.

Five Kearney players were also selected as first team players on the Lincoln Sunday Journal and Star 1967 Nebraska all-college football team: quarterback Rich Osentowski; offensive guards Dale Naprstek and Ron Hadwiger; linebacker Lee Jacobsen; and defensive back Ron Laux.

== Schedule ==
Date	Opponent	Site	Result	Attendance	Source
September 9	Montana State Billings*	Kearney, NE	W 34–20		
September 16	Washburn*	Kearney, NE	W 55–6		
September 23	at Fort Hays State*	Hays, KS	W 27–7		
September 30	at Peru State	Peru, NE	W 42–0		
October 7	at Wayne State (NE)	Wayne, NE	W 35–14		
October 14	Dakota Wesleyan*	Kearney, NE	W 74–7		
October 21	Chadron State	Kearney, NE	W 49–0	6,650	
October 28	Hastings	Kearney, NE	W 48–0		
November 11	at Northern State (SD)*	Aberdeen, SD	W 24–14		
*Non-conference game
