= Allen H. Zikmund =

American football player and coach (1922–2018)

Biographical details
- Born: March 26, 1922; Ord, Nebraska, U.S.
- Died: January 29, 2018 (aged 95); Kearney, Nebraska, U.S.

Playing career
- 1940–1942: Nebraska
- Position: Halfback

Coaching career (HC unless noted)
- 1947–1953: Alliance HS (NE)
- 1954: Grand Island HS (NE)
- 1955–1971: Kearney State

Administrative career (AD unless noted)
- 1971–1987: Kearney State

Head coaching record
- Overall: 121–31–3 (college)
- Bowls: 0–1
- Tournaments: 0–1 (NAIA playoffs)

Accomplishments and honors

Championships
- 11 NCC (1955–1956, 1958–1959, 1962–1965, 1967–1969)

Allen Herman Zikmund (March 26, 1922 – January 28, 2018) was an American football player and coach. He served as the head football coach at the University of Nebraska at Kearney–then known as Kearney State College–from 1955 to 1971, compiling a record of 121–31–3. He played college football at the University of Nebraska, lettering from 1940 to 1942. Zikmund was selected 109th overall in the 12th round by the Chicago Bears in the 1943 NFL draft.

== Head coaching record ==
=== College ===
| Year | Team | Overall | Conference | Standing | Bowl/playoffs |
|---|---|---|---|---|---|
Kearney State Antelopes (Nebraska College Conference) (1955–1971)
| 1955 | Kearney State | 8–2 | 6–1 | 1st | L Botany Bowl |
| 1956 | Kearney State | 9–0 | 7–0 | 1st | |
| 1957 | Kearney State | 6–3 | 4–3 | 4th | |
| 1958 | Kearney State | 9–0 | 7–0 | 1st | |
| 1959 | Kearney State | 8–2 | 7–0 | 1st | |
| 1960 | Kearney State | 4–5 | 4–2 | T–2nd | |
| 1961 | Kearney State | 7–2 | 4–2 | 2nd | |
| 1962 | Kearney State | 6–1–1 | 4–0–1 | 1st | |
| 1963 | Kearney State | 9–1 | 5–0 | 1st | L NAIA Semifinal |
| 1964 | Kearney State | 7–1 | 4–0 | 1st | |
| 1965 | Kearney State | 7–2 | 3–1 | T–1st | |
| 1966 | Kearney State | 8–2 | 3–1 | 2nd | |
| 1967 | Kearney State | 9–0 | 4–0 | 1st | |
| 1968 | Kearney State | 6–2 | 4–0 | 1st | |
| 1969 | Kearney State | 5–3–1 | 2–0–1 | 1st | |
| 1970 | Kearney State | 8–2 | 2–1 | 2nd | |
| 1971 | Kearney State | 5–3–1 | 2–1 | 2nd | |
| Kearney State: | | 121–31–3 | 72–12–2 | | |
| Total: | | 121–31–3 | | | |
National championship Conference title Conference division title or championship game berth
