= 1949 Wayne State Wildcats football team =

American college football season

1949 Wayne State Wildcats football

NCC champion
- Conference: Nebraska College Conference
- Record: 9–0 (8–0 NCC)
- Head coach: Jack Wink (1st season)
- Home stadium: Wayne Memorial Stadium

1949 Nebraska College Conference football standings
	Conf.					Overall
Team	W		L		T	W		L		T
Wayne State (NE) $	8	–	0	–	0	9	–	0	–	0
Chadron State	6	–	2	–	0	7	–	3	–	0
Doane	5	–	2	–	0	5	–	4	–	0
Kearney State	3	–	3	–	1	5	–	3	–	1
Hastings	3	–	3	–	1	4	–	3	–	1
Nebraska Wesleyan	4	–	4	–	0	4	–	5	–	0
Peru State	2	–	5	–	0	4	–	5	–	0
York (NE)	0	–	6	–	0	2	–	7	–	0
Midland	0	–	6	–	0	1	–	7	–	0
$ – Conference champion

The 1949 Wayne State Wildcats football team represented Nebraska State Teachers College at Wayne (later renamed Wayne State College) as a member of the Nebraska College Conference (NCC) during the 1949 college football season. In their first year under head coach Jack Wink, the Wildcats compiled a perfect 9–0 record (8–0 against NCC opponents), outscored opponents by a total of 218 to 67, and won the NCC championship.

Wink was hired as the team's head coach in late July 1949. He previously played at quarterback for the 1942 Wisconsin Badgers football team and the 1943 Michigan Wolverines football team, both of which were ranked No. 3 in the final AP Polls.

The team played its home games at the new Wayne Memorial Stadium in Wayne, Nebraska. The new concrete stadium was dedicated by Governor Val Peterson on September 9, 1949.

The 1949 team was the first, and remains the only, Wayne State team to compile a perfect season in more than 100 years of the program's history. (The 1931 team was also undefeated but had a tie on its record.)

== Schedule ==
Date	Opponent	Site	Result	Source
September 9	Westmar*	Wayne Memorial Stadium; Wayne, NE	W 33–0	
September 17	Hastings	Wayne Memorial Stadium; Wayne, NE	W 20–6	
September 23	at Midland	Fremont, NE	W 37–7	
October 1	Nebraska Wesleyan	Wayne Memorial Stadium; Wayne, NE	W 20–13	
October 8	Peru State	Wayne Memorial Stadium; Wayne, NE	W 28–6	
October 14	at York (NE)	York, NE	W 26–14	
October 22	Chadron State^{†}	Wayne Memorial Stadium; Wayne, NE	W 14–6	
October 28	at Kearney State	Kearney, NE	W 20–2	
November 4	at Doane	Crete, NE	W 20–13	
*Non-conference game; ^{†}Homecoming
