= L. F. "Pop" Klein =

American football and basketball coach

Biographical details
- Born: c. 1900
- Died: October 14, 1968 (aged 68); Prescott, Arizona, U.S.
- Education: Cotner

Coaching career (HC unless noted)

Football
- 1923–1934: Crete HS (NE)
- 1935–1942: Kearney State
- 1945–1958: Nebraska (assistant)

Basketball
- 1923–1935: Crete HS (NE)
- 1935–1937: Kearney State
- 1945–1946: Nebraska

Head coaching record
- Overall: 42–21–1 (college football); 22–28 (college basketball); 89–19 (high school football); 200–54 (high school basketball)

Accomplishments and honors

Championships
- Football; 4 NIAA (1936, 1938, 1941–1942)

Lloyd Frederick "Pop" Klein (c. 1900 – October 14, 1968) was a coach of football and basketball at the high school and collegiate levels.

He began his career as a football and basketball at Crete High School where he accumulated an 89–19 record in football and 200–54 in basketball. He won a state basketball championship at Crete in 1928.

Klein then moved on to become the head football coach at the University of Nebraska–Kearney where led them to a 42–21–1 in eight seasons. Klein was also the Nebraska–Kearney head men's basketball coach for two seasons (1935–1937) where he led the teams to a 15–15 record. After that, he became an assistant football coach at the University of Nebraska–Lincoln for 14 seasons. During his first year in Lincoln, he stepped in to be the men's basketball coach for one year due to the head coach being ill.

Klein died at the age of 68, on October 14, 1968, at his home in Prescott, Arizona.

== Head coaching record ==
=== College football ===
Year	Team	Overall	Conference	Standing	Bowl/playoffs
Kearney State Antelopes (Nebraska Intercollegiate Athletic Association) (1935–1943)
1935	Kearney State	5–3	2–2	T–2nd	
1936	Kearney State	7–2	3–0	1st	
1937	Kearney State	5–3–1	1–1–1	T–2nd	
1938	Kearney State	4–4–1	2–0–1	T–1st	
1939	Kearney State	3–5	0–3	4th	
1940	Kearney State	7–2	2–1	2nd	
1941	Kearney State	8–0	3–0	1st	
1942	Kearney State	6–2	2–1	1st	
Kearney State:		45–21–2	15–8–2		
Total:		42–21–1			
National championship Conference title Conference division title or championship game berth
