= 1958 Kearney State Antelopes football team =

American college football season

1958 Kearney State Antelopes football

NCC co-champion
- Conference: Nebraska College Conference
- Record: 9–0 (7–0 NCC)
- Head coach: Allen H. Zikmund (4th season)
- Home stadium: College Stadium

1958 Nebraska College Conference football standings
	Conf.					Overall
Team	W		L		T	W		L		T
Kearney State +	7	–	0	–	0	9	–	0	–	0
Chadron State +	7	–	0	–	0	8	–	0	–	0
Peru State	6	–	1	–	0	7	–	1	–	0
Nebraska Wesleyan	5	–	3	–	0	5	–	4	–	0
Hastings	4	–	3	–	0	4	–	4	–	0
Wayne State (NE)	4	–	4	–	0	4	–	5	–	0
Doane	3	–	6	–	0	3	–	6	–	0
Concordia (NE)	1	–	7	–	0	2	–	7	–	0
Midland	1	–	7	–	0	1	–	7	–	0
Dana	0	–	7	–	0	0	–	8	–	0
+ – Conference co-champions

The 1958 Kearney State Antelopes football team was an American football team that represented Kearney State College (later renamed University of Nebraska at Kearney) as a member of the Nebraska College Conference (NCC) during the 1958 NAIA football season. In their fourth season under head coach Allen H. Zikmund, the Antelopes compiled a perfect 9–0 record (7–0 against NCC opponents), tied with Chadron State for the NCC championship, and outscored opponents by a total of 389 to 42. They ranked eighth in the final NAIA poll.

The 1958 season was one of four perfect seasons in the history of the Kearney football program, along with the 1941, 1956, and 1967 seasons.

== Schedule ==
Date	Opponent	Site	Result	Source
September 13	at Moorhead State	Moorhead, MN	W 44–0	
September 19	Fort Hays State	College Stadium; Kearney, NE	W 35–7	
September 27	at Midland	Military Memorial Stadium; Fremont, NE	W 28–6	
October 4	Wayne State (NE)^{†}	College Stadium; Kearney, NE	W 56–0	
October 11	at Doane	Crete, NE	W 33–0	
October 17	Hastings	College Stadium; Kearney, NE	W 35–13	
October 24	Nebraska Wesleyan	College Stadium; Kearney, NE	W 14–0	
October 31	at Dana	Veterans Field; Blair, NE	W 73–13	
November 7	Concordia (NE)	College Stadium; Kearney, NE	W 71–3	
^{†}Homecoming
