= 1956 Kearney State Antelopes football team =

American college football season

1956 Kearney State Antelopes football

NCC champion
- Conference: Nebraska College Conference
- Record: 9–0 (7–0 NCC)
- Head coach: Allen H. Zikmund (2nd season)

1956 Nebraska College Conference football standings
	Conf.					Overall
Team	W		L		T	W		L		T
Kearney State $	7	–	0	–	0	9	–	0	–	0
Hastings	5	–	1	–	0	5	–	2	–	0
Peru State	5	–	2	–	0	6	–	3	–	0
Chadron State	3	–	2	–	1	5	–	2	–	1
Nebraska Wesleyan	3	–	4	–	0	3	–	7	–	0
Doane	2	–	4	–	1	4	–	4	–	1
Midland	1	–	6	–	0	2	–	6	–	0
Wayne State (NE)	0	–	7	–	0	1	–	8	–	0
$ – Conference champion

The 1956 Kearney State Antelopes football team was an American football team that represented Kearney State Teachers College (later renamed University of Nebraska at Kearney) as a member of the Nebraska College Conference (NCC) during the 1956 NAIA football season. In their second season under head coach Allen H. Zikmund, the Antelopes compiled a perfect 9–0 record (7–0 against NCC opponents), won the NCC championship, and outscored opponents by a total of 255 to 66.

The 1956 season was one of four perfect seasons in the history of the Kearney football program, along with the 1941, 1958, and 1967 seasons.

== Schedule ==
Date	Opponent	Site	Result	Source
September 14	at McPherson*	McPherson, KS	W 52–7	
September 21	at Fort Hays State*	Kearney, NE	W 18–6	
September 29	Peru State	Kearney, NE	W 14–12	
October 6	at Midland	Military Memorial Stadium; Fremont, NE	W 26–0	
October 12	at Doane	Crete, NE	W 27–7	
October 19	Hastings	Kearney, NE	W 13–7	
October 26	Chadron State	Kearney, NE	W 44–6	
November 3	at Wayne State (NE)	Wayne, NE	W 26–0	
November 9	Nebraska Wesleyan	Kearney, NE	W 35–21	
*Non-conference game
