= 1953 Peru State Bobcats football team =

American college football season

1953 Peru State Bobcats football

NCC champion
- Conference: Nebraska College Conference
- Record: 8–0 (6–0 NCC)
- Head coach: Alfred G. Wheeler (16th season)
- Home stadium: Peru Oak Bowl

1953 Nebraska College Conference football standings
	Conf.					Overall
Team	W		L		T	W		L		T
Peru State $	6	–	0	–	0	8	–	0	–	0
Wayne State (NE)	4	–	2	–	1	5	–	3	–	1
Kearney State	3	–	2	–	1	3	–	5	–	1
Doane	3	–	2	–	2	4	–	3	–	2
Midland	4	–	3	–	0	5	–	4	–	0
Hastings	3	–	4	–	0	4	–	5	–	0
Nebraska Wesleyan	1	–	4	–	2	2	–	4	–	3
Chadron State	0	–	7	–	0	1	–	7	–	0
$ – Conference champion

The 1953 Peru State Bobcats football team was an American football team that represented Peru State College as a member of the Nebraska College Conference (NCC) during the 1953 college football season. In their 16th year under head coach Alfred G. Wheeler, the Pioneers compiled an 8–0 record (6–0 against conference opponents), won the NCC championship, and outscored opponents by a total of 201 to 85. The 1953 season was part of a 26-game winning streak that began on November 3, 1951, and ended on October 15, 1954, and included consecutive perfect seasons in 1952 and 1953. The team played its home games at the Peru Oak Bowl in Peru, Nebraska.

== Schedule ==
Date	Opponent	Site	Result	Source
September 11	Panhandle A&M*	Peru Oak Bowl; Peru, NE	W 13–6	
September 18	Central (IA)*	Peru Oak Bowl; Peru, NE	W 33–7	
September 25	Hastings	Peru Oak Bowl; Peru, NE	W 27–20	
October 3	at Chadron State	Chadron, NE	W 33–6	
October 10	Nebraska Wesleyan^{†}	Peru Oak Bowl; Peru, NE	W 30–13	
October 16	at Midland	Fremont, NE	W 25–7	
October 24	at Doane	Crete, NE	W 27–19	
October 30	Wayne State (NE)	Peru Oak Bowl; Peru, NE	W 13–7	
*Non-conference game; ^{†}Homecoming
