= Harry Tollefsen =

American football and basketball coach

Harry Tollefson
Biographical details
- Born: April 12, 1891
- Died: September 24, 1947 (aged 56); Kearney, Nebraska, U.S.

Coaching career (HC unless noted)

Football
- 1914–1916: Kearney Normal

Basketball
- 1914–1917: Kearney Normal

Head coaching record
- Overall: 10–10–1 (football); 11–22 (basketball)

Harry Ralph Tollefson (April 12, 1891 – September 24, 1947) was an American football and basketball coach. He served as the head football coach at Kearney State Normal College—now known as the University of Nebraska–Kearney—from 1914 to 1916, compiling a record of 10–10–1. Tollefson was also the head basketball coach at Kearney State from 1914 to 1917, tallying a mark of 11–22.

== Head coaching record ==
=== Football ===
Year	Team	Overall	Conference	Standing	Bowl/playoffs
Kearney Normal Antelopes (Independent) (1914–1916)
1914	Kearney Normal	3–4			
1915	Kearney Normal	6–1–1			
1916	Kearney Normal	1–5			
Kearney Normal:		10–10–1			
Total:		10–10–1			
