= Byron Chamberlain =

American football player (born 1971)

No. 86, 87, 82, 49
- Position: Tight end

Personal information
- Born: October 17, 1971 (age 55); Honolulu, Hawaii, U.S.
- Listed height: 6 ft 2 in (1.88 m)
- Listed weight: 242 lb (110 kg)

Career information
- High school: Eastern Hills (Fort Worth, Texas)
- College: Wayne State (NE)
- NFL draft: 1995: 7th round, 222nd overall pick

Career history
- Denver Broncos (1995–2000); → Rhein Fire (1996); Minnesota Vikings (2001–2003); Washington Redskins (2003); Denver Broncos (2004)*
- * Offseason or practice squad member only

Awards and highlights
- 2× Super Bowl champion (XXXII, XXXIII); Pro Bowl (2001)

Career NFL statistics
- Receptions: 167
- Receiving yards: 2,048
- Receiving touchdowns: 6
- Stats at Pro Football Reference

Byron Daniel Chamberlain (born October 17, 1971) is an American former professional football player who was a tight end in the National Football League (NFL). He played college football for the Wayne State Wildcats. He was selected in the seventh round of the 1995 NFL draft and played professionally for the Denver Broncos, Minnesota Vikings, and the Washington Redskins. Chamberlain won back-to-back Super Bowl championships as a member of the Broncos (XXXII & XXXIII). He was voted to the 2002 Pro Bowl while with the Vikings.

== Early life ==
Chamberlain was born in Honolulu, Hawaii. Byron grew up in San Diego, CA. After his mother remarried, his family moved to Texas. He attended and graduated from Eastern Hills High School in Fort Worth, Texas. Chamberlain was a star in football, baseball and track for the Highlanders.

== College career ==
Chamberlain's started his college career at the University of Missouri, where he made the All-Big Eight Conference freshman team. Chamberlain transferred to Wayne State College, a Division II College in Nebraska where he was a standout wide receiver from 1993 to 1994 and broke most of the receiving records. In his two seasons with the Wildcats, Chamberlain had 161 catches for 1,941 yards and 14 touchdowns and became the school's all-time leading receiver, In 1993, Chamberlain had 78 catches for 1,015 yards and seven touchdowns to help the 9-1 Wildcats lead NCAA Division II in total offense that season. He added another 83 catches for 926 yards in 1994. The 83 catches tied most in a single season by a Wildcat receiver and his 16 catches vs. Bemidji State that season ranked most in a single game by a WSC receiver. His quarterback was Brett Salisbury, both were roommates and eventual Harlon Hill Trophy finalists. Chamberlain and Salisbury are the only two players to ever be nominated in the school's history for the Harlon Hill Award.

Wayne State teammates Chamberlain, Salisbury, Brad Ottis, and Damon Thomas (American football) all went on to professional careers.

== Professional career ==
Chamberlain was drafted by the Denver Broncos in the seventh round (222nd overall) of the 1995 NFL draft. He played in the NFL for nine seasons. Byron played for Denver Broncos, Minnesota Vikings, and the Washington Redskins in his career.

He spent the 1996 World League season with the Rhein Fire in Germany and led the league with 58 receptions for 685 yards (11.8) and a league leading 8 touchdowns.

Byron was a key contributor as a member of the Denver Broncos back-to-back Super Bowl wins (Super Bowl XXXII & XXXIII). He was voted to the 2002 Pro Bowl while with the Minnesota Vikings. Byron finished his career with 167 catches for 2,048 yards (12.3) with 6 touchdowns.

== NFL career statistics ==
Year	Team	GP	Receiving						Fumbles	
Year	Team	GP	Rec	Yards	Avg	Lng	TD	FD	Fum	Lost
1995	DEN	5	1	11	11.0	11	0	1	0	0
1996	DEN	11	12	129	10.8	17	0	9	0	0
1997	DEN	10	2	18	9.0	9	0	1	0	0
1998	DEN	16	3	35	11.7	16	0	3	0	0
1999	DEN	16	32	488	15.3	88	2	18	0	0
2000	DEN	15	22	283	12.9	38	1	12	0	0
2001	MIN	16	57	666	11.7	47	3	28	1	1
2002	MIN	13	34	389	11.4	61	0	15	0	0
2003	WAS	4	4	29	7.3	15	0	1	0	0
Career		106	167	2,048	12.3	88	6	88	1	1

== Personal life ==
In August 1997, Chamberlain pleaded guilty to harassment charges against his then-wife, Robyn. He was placed on probation for two years. He also was ordered to pay a $138 fine and be evaluated for drug use. Less than a month later, he was arrested and faced domestic violence charges.

In 2003, Chamberlain was cut by the Vikings following a four-game suspension for using the weight-loss drug ephedra. Subsequently, he signed by the Redskins and cut again.

In the fall of 2008, Chamberlain returned to Wayne State in Wayne, Nebraska to complete his degree. Friday, December 19, 2008, Chamberlain received his bachelor's degree in Communications.

Chamberlain started the Byron Chamberlain Foundation in 2000 to assist underserved individuals and communities. Some of the foundations programs have included sports camps for underprivileged kids, clothes and shoe drives, food drives, toy drives as well as health education.

Chamberlain is married to business developer, Angelique Chamberlain.
