= Damon Thomas (American football) =

American football player (born 1970)

No. 86, 82
- Position: Wide receiver

Personal information
- Born: December 15, 1970 (age 55); Clovis, California, U.S.
- Listed height: 6 ft 2 in (1.88 m)
- Listed weight: 215 lb (98 kg)

Career information
- High school: Clovis
- College: Wayne State (NE)
- NFL draft: 1994: undrafted

Career history
- Buffalo Bills (1994–1995); New Jersey Red Dogs (1998); Thonon Black Panthers (2000-2002)

Career NFL statistics
- Receptions: 3
- Receiving yards: 49
- Stats at Pro Football Reference

Damon Thomas (December 15, 1970) is an American former professional football player who was a wide receiver for the Buffalo Bills of the National Football League (NFL). He played college football for the Wayne State Wildcats.

== Early life ==
Thomas was born in Clovis, California. He attended Wayne State College in Nebraska. He and Wildcats' teammates Brett Salisbury, Byron Chamberlain, and Brad Ottis all went on to play professionally.

== Professional career ==
=== NFL ===
He also played two seasons in the NFL for the Buffalo Bills, where he caught three passes in two seasons.

=== Europe/France ===
Thomas played professionally in Europe, first for the Thonon Black Panthers of France in the Championnat Élite Division 1 league.
