= Brad Ottis =

American football player (born 1972)

No. 95, 96
- Position: Defensive end

Personal information
- Born: August 2, 1972 (age 54); Wahoo, Nebraska, U.S.
- Listed height: 6 ft 5 in (1.96 m)
- Listed weight: 290 lb (132 kg)

Career information
- High school: Archbishop Bergan (Fremont, Nebraska)
- College: Wayne State (NE)
- NFL draft: 1994: 2nd round, 56th overall pick

Career history
- Los Angeles/St. Louis Rams (1994–1996); Arizona Cardinals (1996-2000); Sioux City Bandits (2003)

Career NFL statistics
- Tackles: 144
- Sacks: 4
- Passes defended: 2
- Stats at Pro Football Reference

Brad Allen Ottis (born August 2, 1972) is an American former professional football player who was a defensive end in the National Football League (NFL). He was selected by the Los Angeles Rams in the second round of the 1994 NFL draft. He played for the Los Angeles/St.Louis Rams and Arizona Cardinals. Ottis played college football for the Wayne State Wildcats with Byron Chamberlain, Brett Salisbury and Damon Thomas, who all played professionally. After playing in the NFL, Ottis signed with the Sioux City Bandits of the National Indoor Football League.
