= Mason Brodine =

American football player (born 1988)

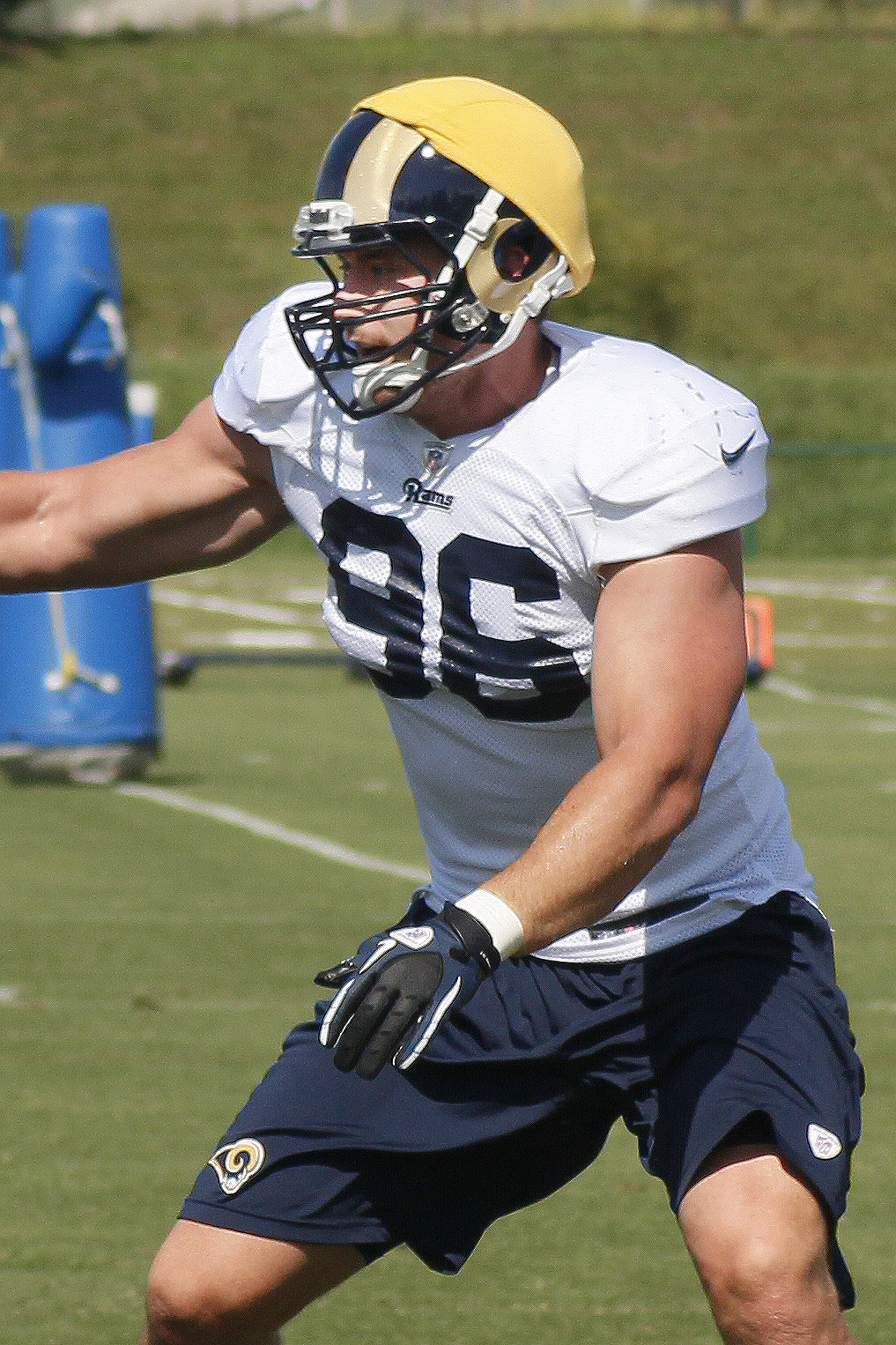
- Brodine during 2013 training camp.

No. 95
- Position: Defensive end / Tight end

Personal information
- Born: February 26, 1988 (age 38); Elm Creek, Nebraska, U.S.
- Listed height: 6 ft 7 in (2.01 m)
- Listed weight: 270 lb (122 kg)

Career information
- High school: Elm Creek (NE)
- College: Nebraska–Kearney
- NFL draft: 2011: undrafted

Career history
- Oakland Raiders (2011); St. Louis Rams (2012–2014); New England Patriots (2015)*
- * Offseason or practice squad member only
- Stats at Pro Football Reference

Mason Brodine (born February 18, 1988) is an American former football tight end. He signed with the Oakland Raiders as an undrafted free agent on July 26, 2011. He played college football for Nebraska–Kearney.

== Early life ==
Brodine attended Elm Creek High school in Nebraska. Brodine helped his high school team win their first playoff game in 2004.

== College career ==
Brodine played college football at the University of Nebraska–Kearney. Brodine was a 2nd-team All-Central Region and 1st-team All-RMAC selection.

== Professional career ==
=== Oakland Raiders ===
On July 26, 2011, Brodine signed with the Oakland Raiders as an Undrafted free agent. On September 3, 2011, he was released. On September 5, 2011, he was signed to the practice squad. On December 17, 2011 he was promoted to the active roster. On December 18, 2011, he made his NFL debut against the Detroit Lions. On August 27, 2012, he was released after appearing in two games in 2011.

=== St. Louis Rams ===
On August 28, 2012, Brodine was claimed off waivers. On August 31, 2012, Brodine was released on the day of roster cuts. On September 2, 2012, Brodine was signed to the practice squad. In 2014, Brodine attempted to make the transition from defensive end to tight end, but injured his ankle and was declared out for the entire season.

=== New England Patriots ===
On August 6, 2014, Brodine signed with the New England Patriots. The team released him four days later.
