= Nebraska–Kearney Lopers =

- University: University of Nebraska at Kearney
- NCAA: Division II
- Conference: The MIAA
- Athletic director: Marc Bauer
- Location: Kearney, Nebraska
- Varsity teams: 17
- Football stadium: Ron & Carol Cope Stadium
- Basketball arena: Health and Sports Center
- Baseball stadium: Kearney Memorial Field
- Nickname: Loper
- Colors: Blue and gold
- Mascot: Louie
- Fight song: "We Fight for UNK!"
- Website: lopers.com

Team NCAA championships
- 5

The Nebraska–Kearney Lopers are the athletic teams that represent the University of Nebraska at Kearney, located in Kearney, Nebraska, in intercollegiate sports as a member of the Division II level of the National Collegiate Athletic Association (NCAA), primarily competing in the Mid-America Intercollegiate Athletics Association (MIAA) for most of its sports since the 2012–13 academic year; while its women's swimming and diving team competes in the Northern Sun Intercollegiate Conference (NSIC). The Lopers previously competed in the D-II Rocky Mountain Athletic Conference (RMAC) from 1994–95 to 2011–12 (which they were a member on a previous stint as a provisional member during the 1989–90 school year); and in the Central States Intercollegiate Conference (CSIC) of the National Association of Intercollegiate Athletics (NAIA) from 1976–77 to 1988–89.

== Conference affiliations ==
- 1916–17 to 1927–28: Nebraska Collegiate Conference
- 1928–29 to 1942–43: Nebraska Intercollegiate Athletic Association
- 1943–44 to 1975–76: Nebraska Collegiate Conference
- 1976–77 to 1988–89: Central States Intercollegiate Conference
- 1989–90 to 1993–94: Independent
- 1994–95 to 2011–12: Rocky Mountain Athletic Conference
- 2012–13 to present: Mid-America Intercollegiate Athletics Association

== Varsity teams ==
MIAA logo Nebraska–Kearney's colors

UNK competes in 17 intercollegiate varsity sports: Men's sports include basketball, cross country, football, tennis, track & field (indoor and outdoor) and wrestling; basketball, cross country, golf, soccer, softball, swimming & diving, tennis, track & field (indoor and outdoor) and volleyball.

Men's sports	Women's sports
Basketball	Basketball
Cross country	Cross country
Football	Golf
Tennis	Soccer
Track and field^{†}	Softball
Wrestling	Swimming and diving
	Tennis
	Track and field^{†}
	Volleyball
† – Track and field includes both indoor and outdoor

=== Football ===
See Also: Nebraska-Kearney Lopers Football

The First UNK Football team was fielded in 1905, going 0-5-1 against local high schools. The 1906 team went 3-4-2, and the first winning season was in 1911, when they went 5-3.No teams were fielded in 1943 and 1944. UNK Football would first appear in the postseason in 1955 in the Botany Bowl, where the Lopers defeated Northern State, 34-13. They would appear in the NAIA playoffs four times (1963, 1977, 1979, 1980), and have appeared in the NCAA Playoffs five times (2002, 2005, 2009, 2011, 2021). UNK would also play in the final Mineral Water Bowl, defeating Winona State, 50-33. Ryan Held is currently the Lopers head coach.

=== Softball ===
The Lopers softball team appeared in the first three Women's College World Series in 1969, 1970 and 1971. Before the Lopers moved to the NCAA Division II level, the Lopers won two NAIA titles in 1987 and 1990.

=== Women's swim and dive ===
The Women's swim and dive team is an affiliate member of the Rocky Mountain Athletic Conference (RMAC).

=== Wrestling ===
The UNK Wrestling team has won all of the Lopers NCAA Division II titles. Current UNK Athletic Director Marc Bauer won three NCAA Division II national titles with the Lopers (2008, 2012, 2013) before stepping down in 2016. Bauer coached 136 academic All-Americans, 89 All-Americans, alongside 22 national champions and 15 runners-up. Dalton Jensen, longtime assistant and 2012 National Champion at UNK (141lbs.) took over, winning three national championships in 2022, 2025, and 2026.

== Discontinued Sports ==
=== Baseball, Men's Golf, and Men's Tennis ===
UNK announced in February of 2018 that the Baseball, Men's Golf, and Men's Tennis programs would be eliminated, citing budget cuts.At the time, UNK said that the sports could be reinstated with an endowment of $10 million for baseball, $5 million for Men's Tennis, and $2.25 million for men's golf. The next month, when it was announced that then-athletic director Paul Plinske was leaving to be as the next AD at Colorado State University-Pueblo, Plinske was quoted in the university press release that "My decision to leave UNK is not taken lightly and is not a result of recent budget cuts. I move on to this new and exciting opportunity knowing I did my absolute best for UNK while serving with passion, professionalism and care."

==== Reinstatement of Men's Tennis ====
UNK announced in 2022 that it was able to bring back the Men's Tennis program starting in the 2023-24 season, thanks to a private donor. A $3.4 million endowment was created for the sport.In 2022, the money needed for an endowment was still $10 million for baseball and $2.25 million for men's golf to be reinstated at UNK.

=== Men's Swimming and Diving ===
Mens Swimming and Diving was sponsored from 1962-1976.

== National championships ==
=== Team ===
Sport	Association	Division	Year	Opponent/Runner-up	Score/Points
Softball (2)	NAIA	Single	1987	Francis Marion	1–0
Softball (2)	NAIA	Single	1990	Pacific Lutheran	6–3 (8 innings)
Wrestling (6)	NCAA	Division II	2008	Minnesota State	108.5–108
Wrestling (6)	NCAA	Division II	2012	St. Cloud State	107–95
Wrestling (6)	NCAA	Division II	2013	St. Cloud State	108–105
Wrestling (6)	NCAA	Division II	2022	Central Oklahoma	127–86
Wrestling (6)	NCAA	Division II	2025	Augustana (SD)	115–63
Wrestling (6)	NCAA	Division II	2026	Wisconsin-Parkside	83-78

== Mascot ==
The mascot at University of Nebraska at Kearney is Louie, who has been at the college since the beginning. He is always at every UNK Athletic event cheering on the Lopers with the cheerleaders.

== Facilities ==
- Foster Field at Ron & Carol Cope Stadium – Home of the Loper football and soccer teams
- Kearney High Pool – Home of the Loper Swim & Dive team
- Dryden Park – Home of the UNK Softball team
- Harmon Park – Home of the UNK Tennis team
- Health and Sports Center – Home of the UNK Basketball, Wrestling, and Volleyball teams
- Kearney High Track - Home for UNK Outdoor Track

== Notable alumni ==
- Kamaru Usman, former UFC Welterweight Champion and 2010 NCAA Division II Wrestling champion
- Stephen Goodin, NFL player
- Randy Rasmussen, former New York Jets player
- Joba Chamberlain, New York Yankees pitcher
- Tervel Dlagnev, Olympic Wrestler
- Mason Brodine, tight end for the St. Louis Rams
- Arthur Hobbs, defensive back for the Hamilton Tiger-Cats
- George Murdoch, former professional wrestler, where he wrestled in World Wrestling Entertainment (a.k.a. the WWE) under the name Brodus Clay, and in the National Wrestling Alliance (a.k.a. the NWA) under the ring name Tyrus
- Ty Danielson, head college basketball coach for the Northwestern Oklahoma State Rangers
