= Nebraska Central College =

College in Central City, Nebraska

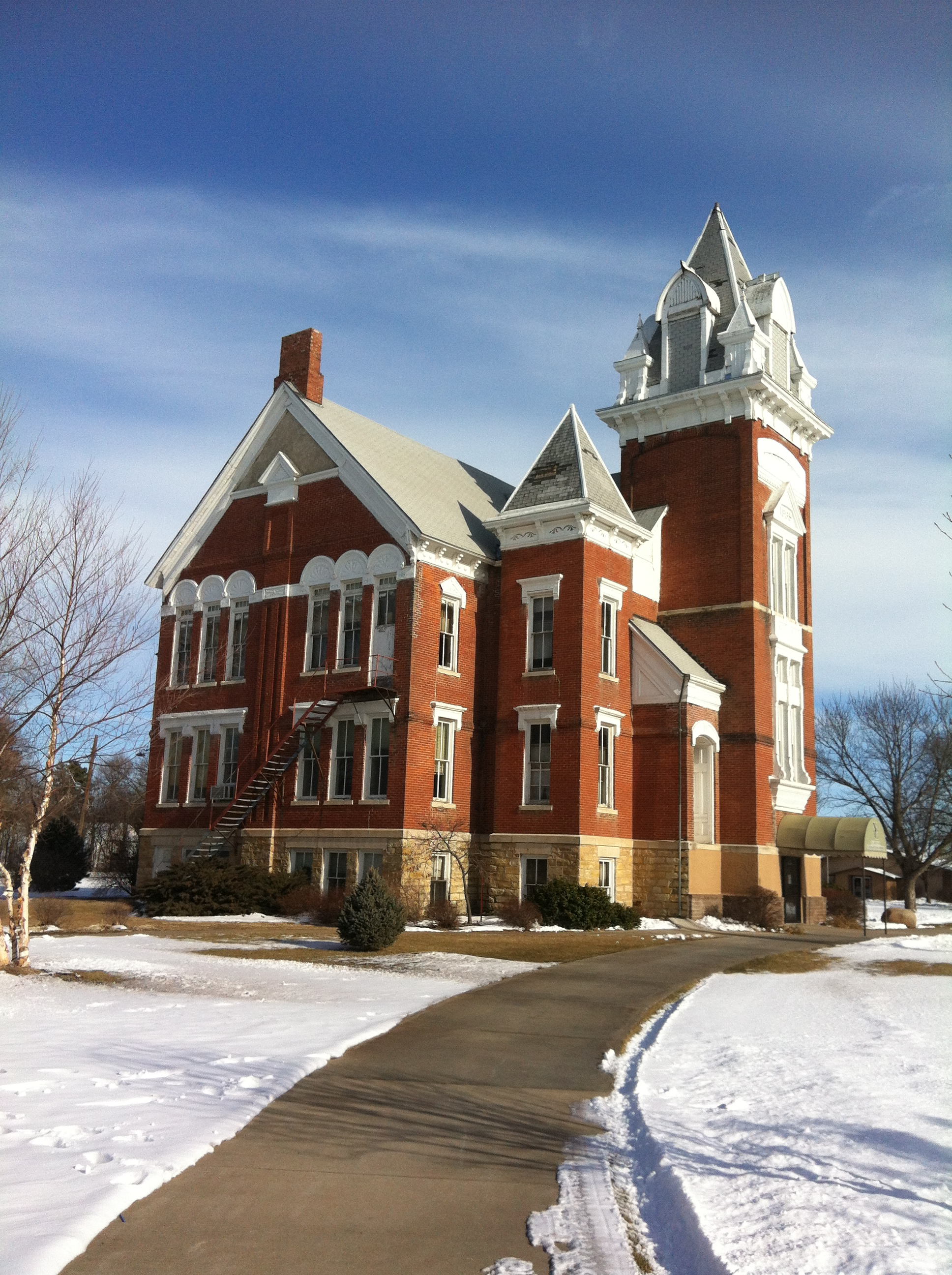
- Main building
- Active: 1885–1952
- Location: Central City, Nebraska, United States

Nebraska Central College was a college located in Central City, Nebraska. It opened in 1885 as a Methodist college. It closed in 1891, but was reopened in 1899 by Quakers. It permanently closed in fall 1952.

In 1958, the school's records and memorabilia were moved to William Penn University in Oskaloosa, Iowa. The former campus is currently the home of Nebraska Christian Schools, a nondenominational Christian K-12 school.
