= Nebraska College Conference =

US intercollegiate athletic league

The Nebraska College Conference (NCC), known as the Nebraska Intercollegiate Conference from 1916 to 1926 and later as the Nebraska College Athletic Conference (NCAC), was an intercollegiate athletic conference that existed from 1916 to 1976. The league had members, as its name suggests, in the state of Nebraska. The public colleges in the conference departed for the separate Nebraska Intercollegiate Athletic Association (NIAA) in 1928 but re-joined after 1942.

In November 1959, the Nebraska College Conference accepted the withdrawal of Concordia College (now known as Concordia University Nebraska), Dana College, and Midland College (now known as Midland University). Those three schools joined the Tri-State Conference at its formation in 1960. Nebraska Wesleyan University left in 1969 to join the newly formed Nebraska Intercollegiate Athletic Conference (NIAC) (now called the Great Plains Athletic Conference (GPAC)).

== Football champions ==
- 1916 – York (NE)
- 1917 – Unknown
- 1918 – Unknown
- 1919 – York (NE)
- 1920 – No champion
- 1921 – Nebraska Wesleyan
- 1922 – Midland
- 1923 – Unknown
- 1924 – Peru Normal
- 1925 – Chadron Normal
- 1926 – Chadron Normal
- 1927 – Peru Normal
- 1928 – Hastings
- 1929 – Cotner
- 1930 – Cotner
- 1931 – Nebraska Wesleyan
- 1932 – Hastings and Nebraska Wesleyan
- 1933 – Hastings
- 1934 – Nebraska Wesleyan
- 1935 – Hastings
- 1936 – Hastings
- 1937 – Hastings
- 1938 – Doane and Midland
- 1939 – Vacant
- 1940 – Doane and Hastings
- 1941 – Midland
- 1942 – Doane
- 1943 – No champion
- 1944 – No champion
- 1945 – Nebraska Wesleyan
- 1946 – Doane
- 1947 – Chadron State and Nebraska Wesleyan
- 1948 – Chadron State and Wayne State (NE)
- 1949 – Wayne State (NE)
- 1950 – Doane
- 1951 – Doane and Peru State
- 1952 – Peru State
- 1953 – Peru State
- 1954 – Hastings
- 1955 – Kearney State
- 1956 – Kearney State
- 1957 – Hastings
- 1958 – Chadron State and Kearney State
- 1959 – Kearney State
- 1960 – Peru State
- 1961 – Peru State
- 1962 – Kearney State
- 1963 – Kearney State
- 1964 – Kearney State
- 1965 – Kearney State, Peru State, and Wayne State (NE)
- 1966 – Wayne State (NE)
- 1967 – Kearney State
- 1968 – Kearney State
- 1969 – Kearney State
- 1970 – Wayne State (NE)
- 1971 – Wayne State (NE)
- 1972 – Kearney State
- 1973 – Kearney State and Peru State
- 1974 – Kearney State
- 1975 – Kearney State
- 1976 – Kearney State

== See also ==
- List of defunct college football conferences
