= Chadron State Eagles =

- University: Chadron State College
- Nickname: Eagles
- NCAA: Division II
- Conference: RMAC
- Athletic director: Mannie Reinsch
- Location: Chadron, Nebraska
- Varsity teams: 14 (6 men's, 8 women's)
- Football stadium: Elliott Field at Don Beebe Stadium
- Basketball arena: Chicoine Center
- Other venues: Nelson Physical Activity Center
- Colors: Cardinal and white
- Website: chadroneagles.com
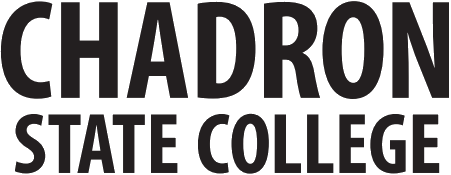

The Chadron State Eagles are the athletic teams that represent Chadron State College, located in Chadron, Nebraska, in NCAA Division II intercollegiate sports. The Eagles compete as members of the Rocky Mountain Athletic Conference for all 14 varsity sports.

== Varsity teams ==
Men's sports

- Basketball
- Cross Country
- Football
- Rodeo
- Track & Field
- Wrestling

Women's sports

- Basketball
- Cross Country
- Golf
- Rodeo
- Softball
- Track & Field
- Volleyball
- Wrestling

== Alumni ==
Don Beebe played in the National Football League with three teams, the Buffalo Bills, the Carolina Panthers and the Green Bay Packers. Beebe was the first player in NFL history to play in six Super Bowls.

Danny Woodhead is a two-time winner of the Harlon Hill Trophy for best player in NCAA Division II football (2006 and 2007). Woodhead became the all-time leading rusher in NCAA football Oct. 6, 2007. CSC retired Woodhead's No. 3 jersey Dec. 15, 2007, the first time a jersey was retired in the college's history. Woodhead has played for the New York Jets, the New England Patriots and the San Diego Chargers. On March 9. 2017, Woodhead signed a three-year contract with the Baltimore Ravens.

Brett Hunter won the Division II National Championship in wrestling in the 2006–2007 season and again in the 2008–2009 season. Hunter was the first National Champion from CSC in 35 years, and the second in school history. He is the only CSC wrestler to win two titles. Josh Majerus won the Division II National Championship in the 2007–2008 season. He is the third champion in CSC history.
