= Nebraska Intercollegiate Athletic Association =

College sports conference in Nebraska, 1928–1942

The Nebraska Intercollegiate Athletic Association (NIAA) was an intercollegiate athletic conference that existed from 1928 to 1942. The league comprised public state colleges in the state of Nebraska. After the NIAA folded in 1942, most of the league's members re-joined the Nebraska College Conference.

== Football champions ==
- 1928 – Peru Normal
- 1929 – Chadron Normal and Peru Normal
- 1930 – Kearney State
- 1931 – Wayne State
- 1932 – Peru State
- 1933 – Chadron State
- 1934 – Omaha
- 1935 – Omaha
- 1936 – Kearney State
- 1937 – Chadron State
- 1938 – Kearney State and Wayne State (NE)
- 1939 – Peru State
- 1940 – Peru State
- 1941 – Kearney State
- 1942 – Kearney State

== See also ==
- List of defunct college football conferences
