= Brett Salisbury =

American football player, model, and author (born 1968)

No. 12 – Wayne State Wildcats
- Position: Quarterback

Personal information
- Born: October 11, 1968 (age 58); Dayton, Ohio, U.S.
- Listed height: 6 ft 3 in (1.91 m)
- Listed weight: 245 lb (111 kg)

Career information
- High school: Escondido (CA)
- College: BYU (1986–1987, 1989); Palomar (1990); Oregon (1991); Wayne State (1992–1993)

Brett Jon Salisbury (born October 11, 1968) is an American former college football quarterback, model, and author. He played college football at Brigham Young University, the University of Oregon, and Wayne State College before playing professionally in Europe. During the mid-1990s he also worked as an international commercial model based primarily in Milan, Italy, and Scandinavia. In 2012, L'Uomo Vogue included Salisbury at No. 15 in its feature "The Top 25 Male Models Ever."

== Early life ==
Salisbury, the younger brother of former NFL quarterback Sean Salisbury, grew up in Escondido, California. He was a pitcher for the Escondido Little League that finished fifth in the 1981 Little League World Series.

He attended Orange Glen High School, where he was quarterback for the school's football team. A highly sought-after recruit, Salisbury graduated in 1986 and accepted a football scholarship to Brigham Young University.

== Football career ==
At BYU, Salisbury backed up eventual Heisman Trophy winner Ty Detmer during the 1986 and 1987 seasons. He then left BYU to serve a mission for The Church of Jesus Christ of Latter-day Saints in Toronto, Canada, from 1988 to October 1989.

Salisbury returned to BYU following his mission but was dismissed from the team in March 1990. He subsequently played for Palomar College during the 1990 season, where he was named a JC Gridwire All-American and California Offensive Player of the Year. Salisbury established several school passing records before transferring to the University of Oregon in 1991.

At Oregon he was considered a successor to Bill Musgrave. After suffering a preseason hernia injury, Salisbury lost the starting position but started three games during the 1991 season after injuries to Danny O'Neil.

Following the 1991 season Salisbury transferred to Wayne State College, where he became the Wildcats' starting quarterback in 1993.

He led Wayne State to a 9–1 record while ranking second in NCAA Division II in passing efficiency with a rating of 166.3 and third nationally in total offense with 373.2 yards per game.

Salisbury was nominated for the Harlon Hill Trophy, awarded annually to the nation's outstanding NCAA Division II football player.

Salisbury holds three NCAA Division II career records set during the 1993 season: highest average gain per play in a season (8.8 yards, minimum 350 plays), most games gaining 300 yards or more in a season (10), and most consecutive games gaining 300 yards or more in a season (10).

Following college, Salisbury played professionally in Europe with the Helsinki Giants of Finland and the Prague Panthers.

== Modeling career ==
While playing professional football in Europe, Salisbury began working as an international commercial model. Based primarily in Milan, Italy, and Scandinavia during the mid-1990s, he appeared in commercial campaigns for companies including Nokia, Nexxus Hair, Paulig, and Laura Biagiotti. In 2012, L'Uomo Vogue ranked Salisbury No. 15 in its feature "The Top 25 Male Models Ever." The accompanying editorial stated that Salisbury likely would have ranked even higher had he remained in the fashion industry longer.

== Post-football career ==
In 2008, Salisbury wrote The Transform Diet, which was published by iUniverse.

Salisbury is a member of The Church of Jesus Christ of Latter-day Saints.
