= York University (Nebraska) =

Private university in York, Nebraska, US

Coordinates: 40°52′11″N 97°34′48″W

- Former name: York College (1890–2022)
- Type: Private college
- Established: 1890; 136 years ago
- Religious affiliation: Churches of Christ
- President: Timothy Westbrook
- Students: 711 (fall 2023)
- Location: York, Nebraska, U.S.
- Campus: Urban, 50 acres (20 ha)
- Colors: Blue and white
- Nickname: Panthers
- Sporting affiliations: NAIA – KCAC
- Website: york.edu
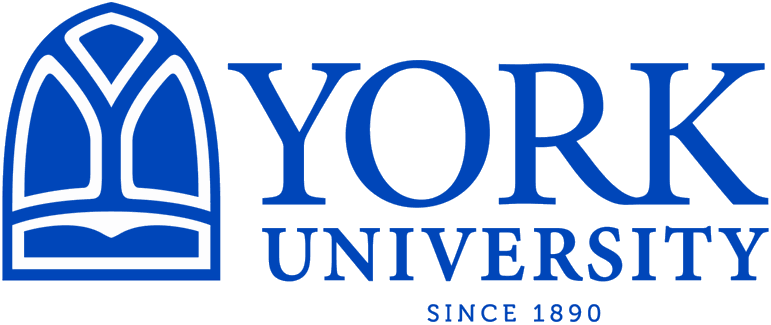

York University is a private college affiliated with the Churches of Christ and located in York, Nebraska, United States. The college was founded in 1890 as York College and was founded by the United Brethren Church. The college was closed by the church in 1954, however, it was re-established two years later. The college re-branded to its current name in 2022.

== History ==
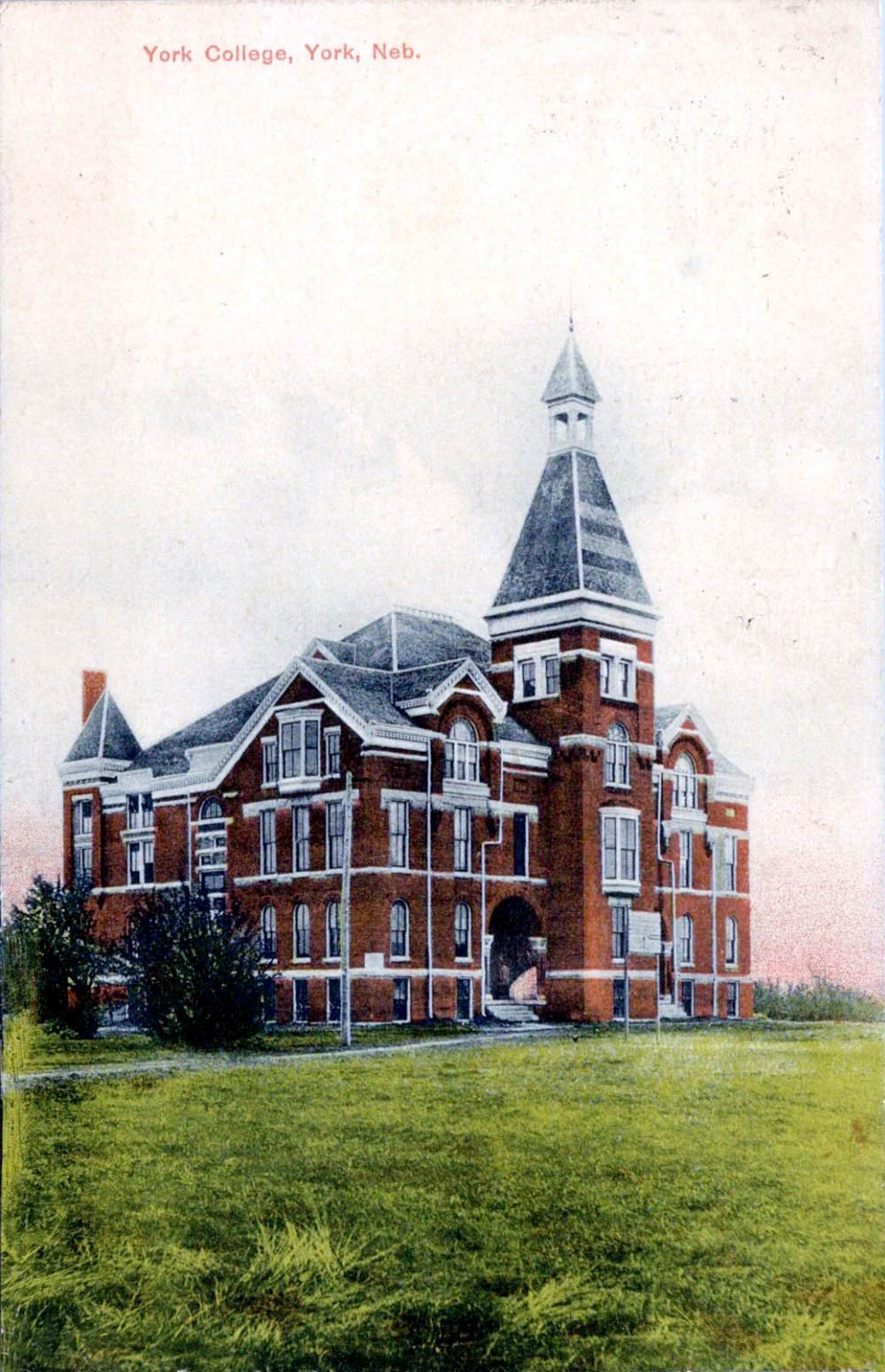
The college in 1908

York University was founded in 1890 as York College and was operated by the United Brethren Church. From its founding to 1892, the college operated primarily in rented halls, until its first permanent building was completed in 1892. York College's first building was three stories tall and could accommodate up to 400 students. By 1912, the college had grown to three buildings and 8,000 total students.

In 1946, ownership of the college was transferred from the United Brethren Church to the Evangelical United Brethren Church, following the church's merger with the Evangelical Church. The College Administration Building, the oldest building on campus, was destroyed by a fire in January 1951. In 1954, the church closed York College after it moved operations to its Westmar, Iowa campus.

In August 1955, an agreement was made between the Church of Christ and the Evangelical United Brethren Church to transfer ownership of the former college to the Church of Christ. York College was later re-established the following year and re-opened on September 10, 1956. In 1959, the college was changed to being a junior college, re-branding to York Junior College. The name change resulted in a drop of enrollment.

In 1992, following four years of effort, York College was accredited by the Higher Learning Commission as a senior college. York College opened its main building, the Phyllis J. Mackey Center, in October 1998. In 2022, York College changed its name to York University. The name was changed to update the title of the university, as there was concern that people would mis-understand what the college title meant.

== Academics ==
Undergraduate demographics as of 2025
Race and ethnicity	Total
White	54%
Hispanic	20%
Native American	1%
Black	11%
International student	11%
Unknown	3%
Economic diversity
Low-income (Note: The percentage of students who received an income-based federal Pell grant intended for low-income students.)	45%
Affluent (Note: The percentage of students who are a part of the American middle class at the bare minimum.)	55%

As of 2025, York University has a total of 440 enrolled students. The university provides both residential, traditional undergraduate education and online, non-traditional programs. Baccalaureate degrees offered include the Bachelor of Arts, Bachelor of Business Administration, Bachelor of Music, and Bachelor of Science. York University also offers the Master of Arts through York University Online. York University is accredited by the Higher Learning Commission. The institution's teacher education program is accredited by the Council for the Accreditation of Educator Preparation (CAEP).

== Campus ==
The university's campus is situated on 50 acres (20 ha) of land and includes seventeen major buildings.

== Athletics ==
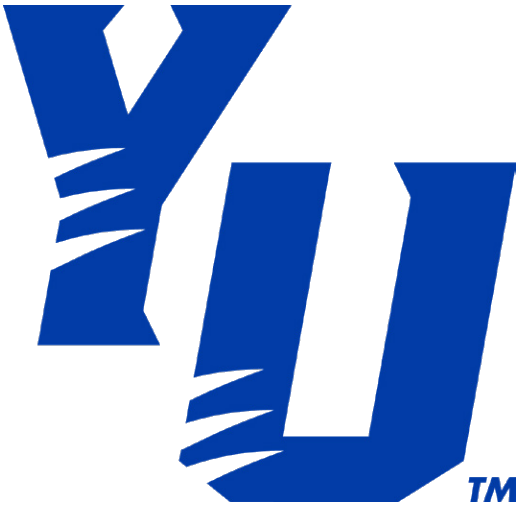
York athletics logo

The York athletic teams are called the Panthers. The university is a member of the National Association of Intercollegiate Athletics (NAIA), primarily competing in the Kansas Collegiate Athletic Conference since the 2016–17 academic year. They were also a member of the National Christian College Athletic Association (NCCAA), primarily competing as an independent in the Central Region of the Division I level. The Panthers previously competed in the defunct Midlands Collegiate Athletic Conference (MCAC) from 1994–95 to 2014–15 (when the conference dissolved); as well as an NAIA Independent within the Association of Independent Institutions (AII) during the 2015–16 school year.

York competes in 20 intercollegiate varsity sports: men's sports include baseball, basketball, cross country, golf, soccer, track & field (indoor and outdoor) and wrestling; women's sports include basketball, cross country, golf, soccer, softball, track & field (indoor and outdoor), volleyball and wrestling; and co-ed sports include cheerleading, dance and eSports.
