= Peru State College =

Public college in Peru, Nebraska, U.S.

Coordinates: 40°28′30″N 95°43′57″W

- Former names: Mount Vernon School (1865–1866); Peru Seminary and College (1866–1867); Nebraska State Normal School (1867–1921); Nebraska State Teachers College at Peru (1921–1949); Peru State Teachers College (1949–1963)
- Motto: "Campus of a thousand oaks"
- Type: Public college
- Established: 1865
- Parent institution: Nebraska State College System
- President: Dr. Robert Mock
- Students: 1,492 (fall 2024)
- Undergraduates: 1,308 (fall 2024)
- Postgraduates: 184 (fall 2024)
- Location: Peru, Nebraska, United States
- Campus: Rural, 104 acres (42 ha)
- Colors: Azure Blue & White
- Nickname: Bobcats
- Sporting affiliations: NAIA – HAAC
- Mascot: Bob the Bobcat
- Website: www.peru.edu

Peru State College (Peru) is a public college in Peru, Nebraska, United States. It was founded by members of the Methodist Episcopal Church in 1865, and opened in 1866 as Mount Vernon Academy. It is the first and oldest institution of higher education in Nebraska.

The college is organized into three schools, each supporting a different set of majors, including a graduate program, plus an extensive online education program.

== History ==
Peru State College was originally incorporated under the name Mount Vernon School (sometimes reported as Mount Vernon Seminary or Mount Vernon College) on December 2, 1865, under the management of the Methodist Episcopal Church, after the need for a local institution was discussed November 11, 1865. The school was named after the community in which it was located, on a bluff above the Missouri. The town of Mount Vernon was supplanted by a community located at the base of the hill, whose original settlers came from Peru, Illinois. The Nebraska Territorial Legislature chartered the school on February 12, 1866, under the name Peru Seminary and College.

The executive committee of the school deeded the grounds to the State of Nebraska in June 1867, making it the first state-supported college in Nebraska on June 20, 1867, with the first classes held on October 24, 1867. The name was also changed to Nebraska State Normal School. This is also considered the official date of the school's establishment.

The name changed several times in the early to mid 20th century, becoming Nebraska State Teachers College at Peru in 1921, in 1949 Peru State Teachers College, and then the present name of Peru State College in 1963.

During World War II, the Peru campus of the Nebraska State Teachers College hosted a unit of the US Navy V-12 officer training program, which served as an alternative military route for college students who were drafted during the war.

The State of Nebraska established the Nebraska State College System by statute in 1978, and Peru State College was placed by statute under the control of the new governmental body at the same time.

In 1998 the Nebraska State College System evaluated the possibility of closing Peru State College, or moving its campus to another location, among other options, and voted unanimously in 1999 to move Peru State to nearby Nebraska City, Nebraska. However, the legislature concluded that moving the college would have been too costly, and lawmakers decided instead to pump millions of dollars into campus renovations with the understanding the college would work quickly to boost growth.

In 1999 the Nebraska Unicameral Legislature introduced bill LB631, aimed at merging Chadron State College and Wayne State College into the University of Nebraska system, while turning Peru State College into a community college. A competing bill, LB650, was introduced about the same time but with the intent of funding Peru State College $7 million for renovations.

In 2003 rumors spread again about the possibility of closing Peru State College as part of a set of proposals to help save money in the Nebraska education system.

Peru State College celebrated a record 472 graduates in 2007 with student enrollment ballooning even higher. Credit was given largely to its online education programs, which funded about 30 percent of campus initiatives.

== Campus ==
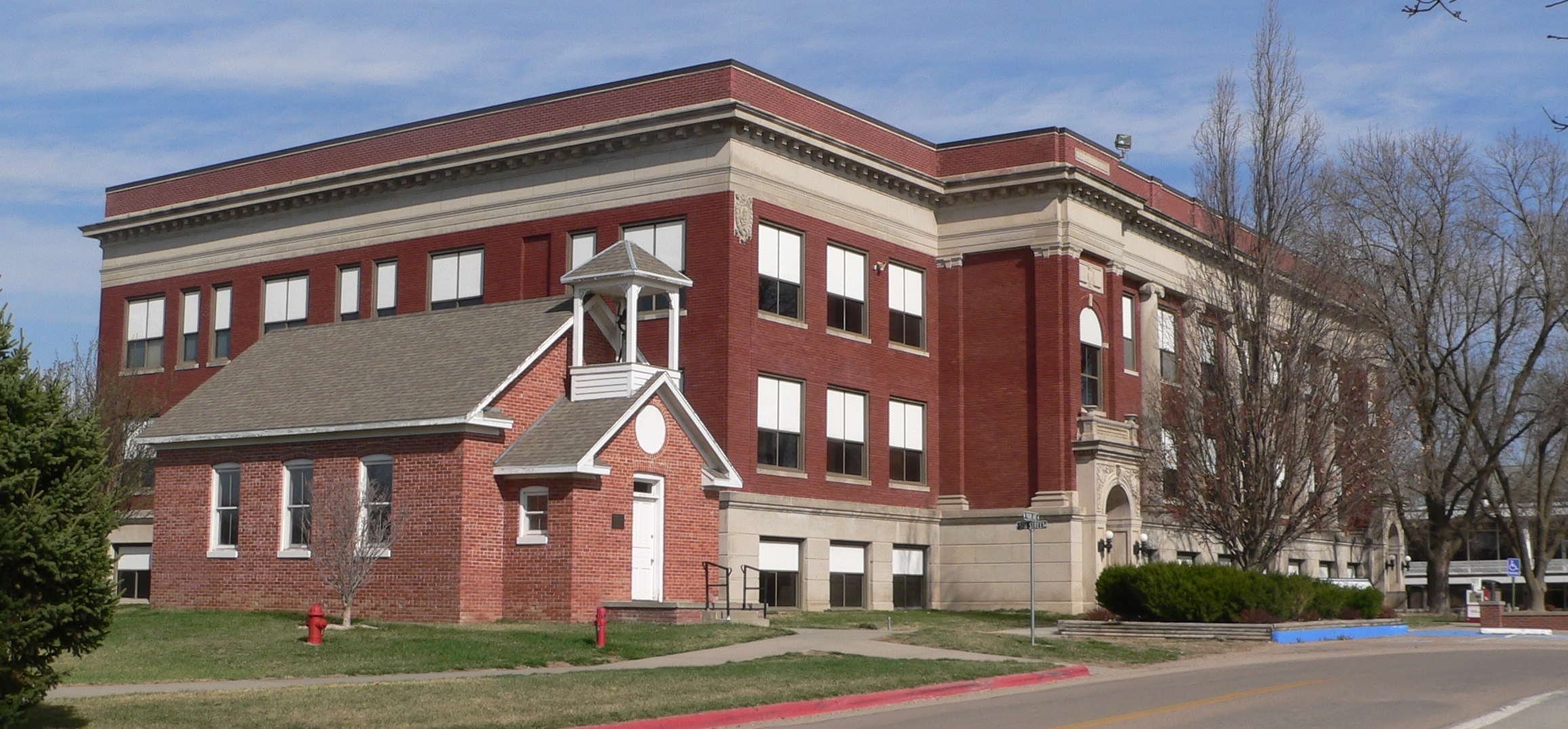
Little Red Schoolhouse and T.J. Majors Building

The 104-acre (42 ha) Peru State College campus is a prominent feature of the small city of Peru, Nebraska, located approximately 11 miles (18 km) northeast of nearby Auburn, Nebraska, and approximately 70 miles (110 km) south of Omaha, Nebraska.

The names of several of the buildings reflect the campus's long history in Nebraska. The T.J. Majors Building, which houses the School of Education and School of Professional Studies, is named in honor of Lt. Col. Thomas Jefferson Majors. The A.D. Majors building, which previously served as a residence hall, is named in honor of his nephew. It was demolished in 2008. These are the only two buildings on campus bearing the name of a person who was never employed by the college. T.J. and A.D. Majors served on the state normal board.

In more recent years, Peru State College underwent massive renovations. These included renovations on the Eliza Morgan women's-only residence hall, providing for more modern amenities for residents. The buildings that previously served as the library and gymnasium were renovated and converted into a modernized library and an Academic Resource Center (ARC). The two buildings are also connected by a skywalk known as the "Bobcat Walk". The Al Wheeler Activity Center (AWAC) has also been renovated. Other renovations are still planned.

== Academics ==
Three schools comprise Peru State College's academic offerings, providing baccalaureate and graduate degrees and certificates of achievement: School of Education, School of Arts and Sciences, and the School of Professional Studies. Peru State's small campus size provides for a small student-faculty ratio.

Arguably the largest academic program at Peru State College, and also its oldest, is the education department, under the School of Education. The original role of Peru State College was that of a normal school, training individuals to become the teachers in public and private elementary and secondary schools. Until the founding of the Nebraska State Normal School at Kearney, now known as the University of Nebraska at Kearney, it was the only normal school in Nebraska.

Peru's continued strong commitment to teacher education is also reflected in its accreditations and memberships. Peru State College receives accreditation from the National Council for Accreditation of Teacher Education (NCATE) and is a member of the National Council for Teacher Education and the American Association of Colleges for Teacher Education.

The School of Professional Studies houses Peru's Business Administration, Criminal Justice, and Psychology programs.

The School of Arts and Sciences provides Peru's arts and sciences majors. Education endorsements are provided for education majors as well.

Graduate programs offered are the Master of Science and graduate certificates in Education. One graduate certificate is offered in Organizational Development.

== Athletics ==
The Peru State athletic teams are called the Bobcats. The college is a member of the National Association of Intercollegiate Athletics (NAIA), primarily competing in the Heart of America Athletic Conference (HAAC) since the 2011–12 academic year. The Bobcats previously competed in the defunct Midlands Collegiate Athletic Conference (MCAC) from 2000–01 to 2010–11.

Peru State competes in 13 intercollegiate varsity sports: Men's sports include baseball, basketball, bowling, cross country and football; while women's sports include basketball, bowling, cross country, golf, softball and volleyball; and co-ed sports include competitive cheer and competitive dance.

=== Intramurals ===
The college also offers on-campus intramural athletics for student participation. Individual and team competitions are available for meets, leagues, and tournaments.

=== Football ===
The Peru State football team won the 1990 NAIA Division II National Championship, defeating Westminster (Pa.) 17–7. Tom Shea was named the 1990 NAIA Division II Coach of the Year. The football team competes on the Oak Bowl field, which was completed in 1901.

== Student life ==
Undergraduate demographics as of Fall 2023
Race and ethnicity	Total
White	71%
Black	12%
Hispanic	9%
Two or more races	4%
American Indian/Alaska Native	1%
Asian	1%
International student	1%
Economic diversity
Low-income (Note: The percentage of students who received an income-based federal Pell grant intended for low-income students.)	45%
Affluent (Note: The percentage of students who are a part of the American middle class at the bare minimum.)	55%

Peru State College features many modern facilities and accommodations around campus, along with a variety of student organizations, which can be found in the Peru State College student handbook. The college does not have any fraternities or sororities.

=== Student government ===
The Student Senate is the representative body for Peru State College students. Twenty-four (24) students comprise the Senate, with all positions eligible for election annually. The student representative to the Nebraska Board of Trustees is also considered a member of the Student Senate.

Many campus activities are arranged and funded by the student-run Campus Activities Board, or CAB as it is known by Peru State College students. CAB is funded through the activity fee paid by all students. The Residence Hall Association also plans and arranges campus activities in conjunction with CAB.

=== Residence life ===
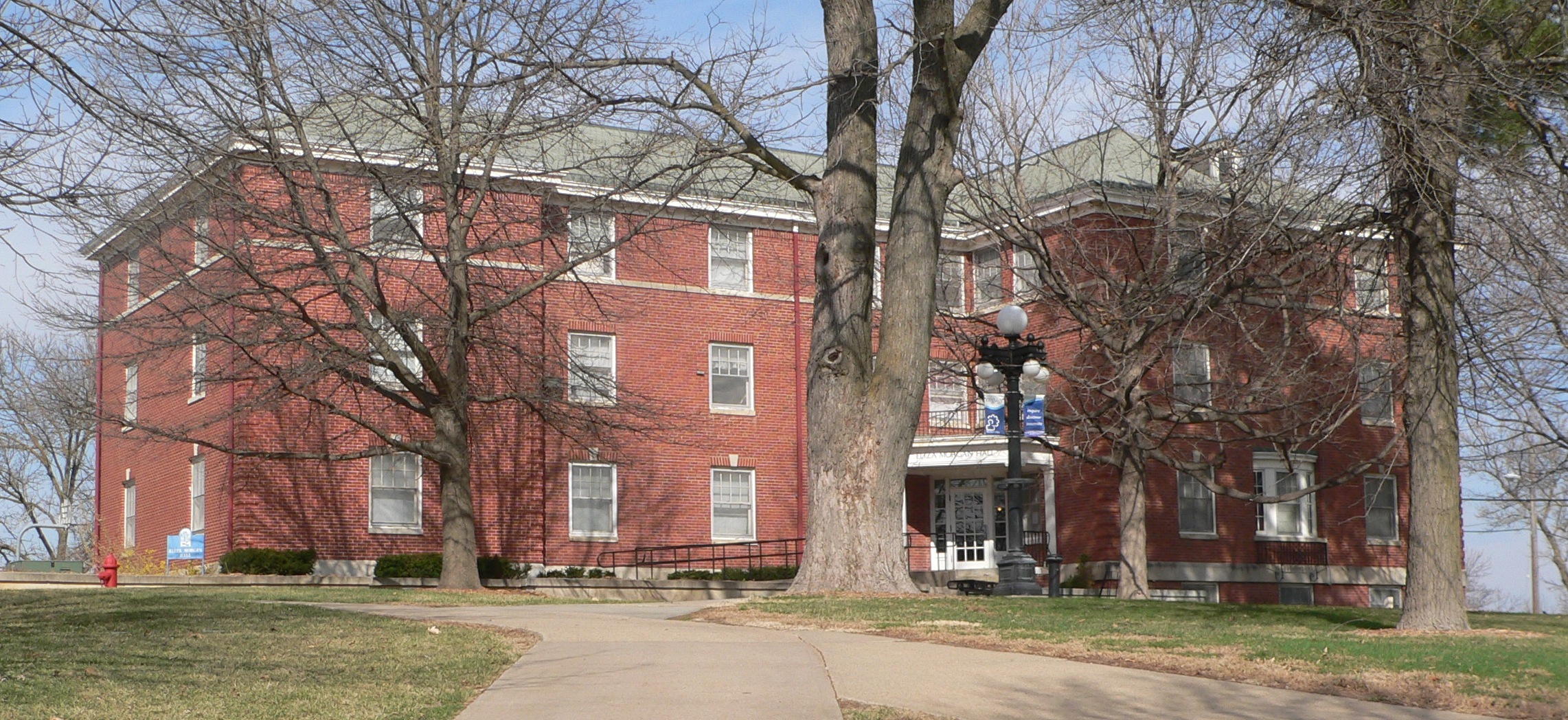
Eliza Morgan Residence Hall

Peru State College provides two single-sex residence halls: Eliza C. Morgan Hall for women only, and W.N. Delzell Hall for men only. There is also a three-building co-educational residence hall complex called the Centennial Complex. Each building of the Centennial Complex is actually two residence halls: Nicholas and Pate, Mathews and Clayburn, Davidson and Palmer.

The Mathews building is where the Honors College lives. Nicholas and Pate Halls are for upper-class students (Juniors and Seniors). W.N. Delzell Hall features the Gaming LLC, and Eliza C. Morgan Hall has the Wellness Community for residents to participate in.

=== Campus media ===
The Peru State Times is Peru State College's student newspaper, previously known as the Pedagogian, published five times per semester and funded by the publication fee paid by students and paid advertising.

== Notable alumni ==
- Clair Armstrong Callan, U.S. Congressman for Nebraska
- Floyd Fithian, Commander in the U.S. Navy, U.S. Congressman for Indiana
- Robert Dinsmore Harrison, U.S. Congressman for Nebraska
- Melvin O. McLaughlin, U.S. Congressman for Nebraska
- Darrell Mudra, college football coach
- Edison Pettit, astronomer, namesake of two craters, Pettit on the Moon and Pettit on Mars
- Orville Ralston, World War I flying ace
- Randy Reeves, former Under Secretary of Veterans Affairs for Memorial Affairs, Commander (ret.) in U.S. Navy
- Danny Shouse, professional basketball player
- Howard Smith, author of "Developing Executive Ability" and "How to Remember Names and Faces"

== Notable faculty ==
- Richard Barrett Lowe – former Governor of Guam and Governor of American Samoa; former dean of the school
- Henry H. Straight – 2nd president of the college and science professor.
