= Peru, Nebraska =

- City
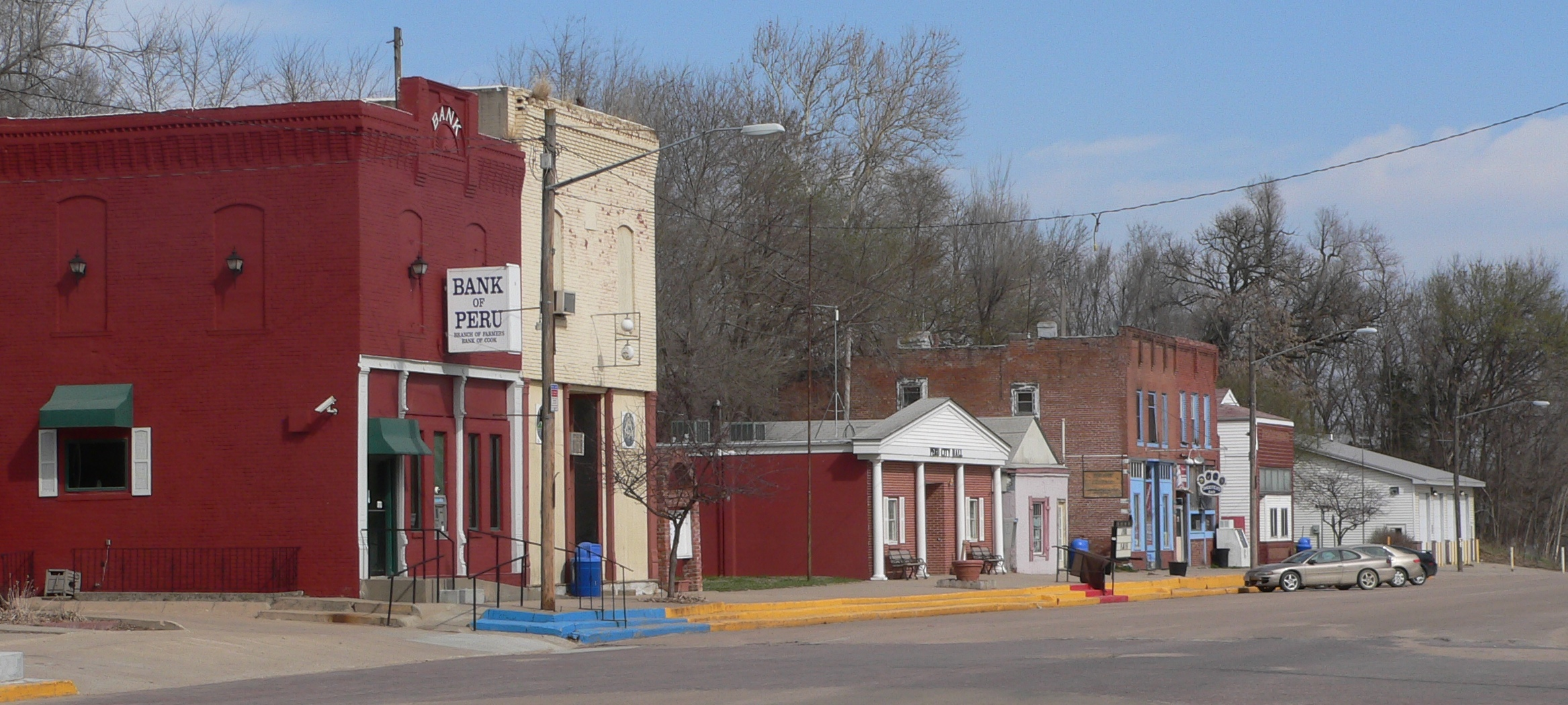
- Downtown Peru, 2011

- Location of Peru, Nebraska
- Coordinates: 40°28′43″N 95°43′53″W
- Country: United States
- State: Nebraska
- County: Nemaha

Area
  - Total: 0.53 sq mi (1.36 km^{2})
  - Land: 0.53 sq mi (1.36 km^{2})
  - Water: 0 sq mi (0.00 km^{2})
- Elevation: 1,027 ft (313 m)

Population (2020)
  - Total: 648
  - Density: 1,232.3/sq mi (475.78/km^{2})
- Time zone: UTC-6 (Central (CST))
  - Summer (DST): UTC-5 (CDT)
- ZIP code: 68421
- Area code: 402
- FIPS code: 31-38960
- GNIS feature ID: 2396191
- Website: City website

Peru is a city in Nemaha County, Nebraska, United States. The population was 648 at the 2020 census. Peru State College is located in the city.

== History ==
The first attempt to settle the community took place in 1853, by some residents of Peru, Illinois. However, troops from Fort Kearny forced them to leave because Nebraska Territory belonged to the Otoe tribe. The settlers then temporarily settled across the Missouri River at Sonora. In 1857, a community formed around a trading post called Mount Vernon on the bluffs above the river on the Nebraska side.

In 1857, settlers founded Peru down the hill from Mount Vernon directly on the Missouri River. In 1861, a Methodist school called Mount Vernon Academy opened. In 1867, the school (which became Peru State College) became the state's first normal school.

Floods in the 1860s changed the course of the river, pushing it nearly a mile from Peru. An 1867 flood caused the Nebraska community of McKissick Island, northeast of Peru, to be surrounded by Missouri land and precipitated a border dispute that would not be resolved until 1999.

== Geography ==
Peru is located at 40°28′48″N 95°43′53″W (40.480055, -95.731286). According to the United States Census Bureau, the city has a total area of 0.53 square miles (1.37 km^{2}), all land.

== Demographics ==
Historical population
Census	Pop.	Note	%±
1880	567		—
1890	624		10.1%
1900	848		35.9%
1910	950		12.0%
1920	783		−17.6%
1930	835		6.6%
1940	1,024		22.6%
1950	1,265		23.5%
1960	1,151		−9.0%
1970	1,380		19.9%
1980	998		−27.7%
1990	1,110		11.2%
2000	569		−48.7%
2010	865		52.0%
2020	648		−25.1%
U.S. Decennial Census

=== 2010 census ===
As of the census of 2010, there were 865 people, 225 households, and 99 families residing in the city. The population density was 1,632.1 inhabitants per square mile (630.2/km^{2}). There were 285 housing units at an average density of 537.7 per square mile (207.6/km^{2}). The racial makeup of the city was 91.8% White, 4.3% African American, 0.9% Native American, 0.3% Asian, 1.0% from other races, and 1.6% from two or more races. Hispanic or Latino of any race were 3.4% of the population.

There were 225 households, of which 22.2% had children under the age of 18 living with them, 30.7% were married couples living together, 7.1% had a female householder with no husband present, 6.2% had a male householder with no wife present, and 56.0% were non-families. 36.9% of all households were made up of individuals, and 9.8% had someone living alone who was 65 years of age or older. The average household size was 2.35 and the average family size was 2.95.

The median age in the city was 21.4 years. 11.6% of residents were under the age of 18; 56.7% were between the ages of 18 and 24; 12.6% were from 25 to 44; 14.2% were from 45 to 64; and 4.9% were 65 years of age or older. The gender makeup of the city was 54.3% male and 45.7% female.

=== 2000 census ===
As of the census of 2000, there were 569 people, 246 households, and 132 families residing in the city. The population density was 1,060.5 inhabitants per square mile (409.5/km^{2}). There were 290 housing units at an average density of 540.5 per square mile (208.7/km^{2}). The racial makeup of the city was 96.66% White, 0.35% African American, 0.18% Native American, 0.35% Asian, 1.76% from other races, and 0.70% from two or more races. Hispanic or Latino of any race were 2.99% of the population.

There were 246 households, out of which 26.0% had children under the age of 18 living with them, 43.1% were married couples living together, 6.1% had a female householder with no husband present, and 46.3% were non-families. 32.9% of all households were made up of individuals, and 10.6% had someone living alone who was 65 years of age or older. The average household size was 2.31 and the average family size was 2.98.

The median age of the population was 29 years. 23.7% of the people were under the age of 18; 22.3% were between 18 and 24 years old; 23.6% were aged 25 through 44; 17.8% were 45 to 64 years old; and 12.7% were 65 or older. In the total population, there were 103.9 males for every 100 females; among those aged 18 and over, there were 107.7 males for every 100 females.

As of 2000 the median income for a household in the city was $27,216, and the median income for a family was $39,875. Males had a median income of $28,125 versus $22,500 for females. The per capita income for the city was $14,637. About 16.0% of families and 20.5% of the population were below the poverty line, including 13.6% of those under age 18 and 14.9% of those age 65 or over.

== International relations ==
In 2011, the city was selected by the Republic of Peru for its "Marca Perú" campaign to promote national pride. A film crew and a number of Peruvian celebrities, including world surfing champion Sofia Mulanovich, tenor Juan Diego Flórez, Academy Award nominee Magaly Solier, Huayno singer Dina Paucar, and chef Gaston Acurio visited the city to film a documentary-style commercial. Páucar, dressed in ethnic Peruvian costume, led a llama through the streets; Peruvian foods such as their national style of cebiche, and Peruvian soft drink Inca Kola were served at a street festival; the Peruvian surfing team performed on tarpaulins in a college parking lot; and an acute accent was painted over the "u" on the city's water tower.

== Education ==
Peru State College, the first college in Nebraska, is located in Peru.

The school district is Auburn Public Schools.

== Notable people ==
- Herbert Brownell Jr., United States Attorney General, was born in Peru.
- Samuel Gordon Daily, United States Congress, lived in Peru.
