= Wayne State Wildcats =

- University: Wayne State College
- Nickname: Wildcats
- NCAA: Division II
- Conference: Northern Sun Intercollegiate Conference
- Athletic director: Mike Powicki
- Location: Wayne, Nebraska
- Varsity teams: 15
- Football stadium: Memorial Stadium
- Basketball arena: Rice Auditorium
- Baseball stadium: Pete Chapman Baseball and Softball Complex
- Soccer stadium: WSC Soccer Field
- Colors: Black and gold
- Website: wscwildcats.com
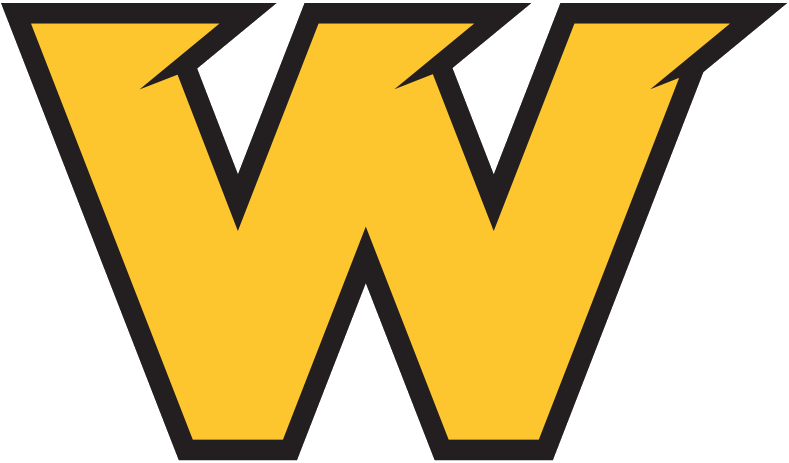

The Wayne State Wildcats are the athletic teams that represent Wayne State College, located in Wayne, Nebraska, in intercollegiate sports at the Division II level of the National Collegiate Athletic Association (NCAA), primarily competing in the Northern Sun Intercollegiate Conference (NSIC) in all sports since the 1999–2000 academic year. The Wildcats previously competed in the Central States Intercollegiate Conference (CSIC) of the National Association of Intercollegiate Athletics (NAIA) from 1976–77 to 1988–89; as well as in the Rocky Mountain Athletic Conference (RMAC) as a provisional member during the 1989–90 school year.

== Varsity teams ==
=== History ===
The college began participating in athletics in 1912, when the football program began. Men's basketball and track and field began around the same time. These were the main sports up to World War II, when Wayne State was a member of the Nebraska Intercollegiate Athletic Association (NIAA) with Kearney, Chadron, Peru, and for a while, Omaha University. After World War II, the NIAA became the Nebraska College Conference (NCC) and Wayne State began to compete in baseball, cross country, golf, swimming, tennis, wrestling, and for a short period, boxing.

Before 1980, cross country, golf, indoor track and field, swimming, tennis, and wrestling were dropped. In 1997, women's soccer was added to the athletics program.

=== List of teams ===
Wayne State competes in 15 intercollegiate varsity sports: Men's sports include baseball, basketball, cross country, football and track & field (indoor and outdoor); while women's sports include basketball, beach volleyball, cross country, golf, soccer, softball, track & field (indoor and outdoor) and volleyball.

== Individual sports ==
=== Football ===
Wayne State began its football program in 1912. In 1970, the team played in a bowl game; it would not do this again until 2007. From 1999, when it joined the Northern Sun Intercollegiate Conference, through 2018, the team went 93–128–0 (.421) . Through the 2018 season, Wayne State sports an all-time record of 425–485–40 (.468).

Four players from the 1993 team went on to play professional football. Brett Salisbury was the starting quarterback for the Helsinki Giants of the Vaahteraliiga in Finland. Damon Thomas was an NFL free agent pick-up by the Buffalo Bills and also played in France Championnat Élite Division 1 for the Thonon Black Panthers. Brad Ottis was a second-round draft choice of the Los Angeles Rams. He also played for the Arizona Cardinals for a few years. Byron Chamberlain was a seventh round draft pick of the Denver Broncos in 1995 and later became a Pro Bowl tight end with the Minnesota Vikings in 2001. No other team in Wayne State history has put more players into professional football. The 1993 WSC football team was inducted into the WSC Athletics Hall of Fame on October 5, 2002.

In 2008, it reached the D-II National Playoffs for the first time; it lost in the first round to Chadron State College (Nebraska). In 2011, they defeated Minnesota-Duluth at Bob Cunningham Field in Wayne; this marked the first time that the Wildcats had won a game against a #1-ranked team.During the 2022 season the Wildcats went 9–3 and for the first time won a share of the NSIC title. The Wildcats made the NCAA DII playoffs where they would lose to Minnesota State–Mankato

=== Softball ===
Wayne State's softball team appeared in five consecutive Women's College World Series, in 1970, 1971, 1972, 1973 and 1974.
