= Chadron State Eagles football =

- First season: 1911
- Head coach: Jay Long; 14th season, 79–68 (.537)
- Location: Chadron, Nebraska
- Stadium: Don Beebe Stadium (capacity: 3,500)
- Field: Elliott Field
- NCAA division: Division II
- Conference: RMAC
- Colors: Cardinal and white
- Website: Chadron Eagles football

The Chadron State Eagles team represents Chadron State College, located in Chadron, Nebraska, in NCAA Division II college football. The Eagles began playing football in 1911 and compete as members of the Rocky Mountain Athletic Conference (RMAC).

The Eagles play their home games at Elliott Field at Don Beebe Stadium

== History ==
In November 2007 the Eagles defeated Abilene Christian University 76–73 in a triple overtime game in the second round of the NCAA D-II football playoffs, with both teams breaking the record for most points ever scored in an NCAA Division II playoff game. Chadron State had rallied from a 49–20 deficit at the end of the third quarter. Both teams accumulated 1369 yards and 21 touchdowns.

=== Conference history ===
- 1989–present: Rocky Mountain Athletic Conference

== Alumni ==
- Don Beebe
- Danny Woodhead
