= Nebraska–Kearney Lopers football =

College football program of the University of Nebraska at Kearney

- First season: 1905; 121 years ago
- Athletic director: Marc Bauer
- Head coach: Ryan Held; 1st season, 3–8 (.273)
- Location: Kearney, Nebraska
- Stadium: Ron & Carol Cope Stadium (capacity: 5,250)
- Field: Foster Field
- NCAA division: Division II
- Conference: The MIAA
- Colors: Blue and gold
- All-time record: 580–399–37 (.589)

Conference championships
- 32
- Rivalries: Fort Hays State
- Fight song: "We Fight for UNK!"
- Mascot: Louie
- Outfitter: Under Armour
- Website: www.lopers.com

The Nebraska–Kearney Lopers football program represents the University of Nebraska at Kearney in college football and competes in the NCAA Division II. In 2012, Nebraska–Kearney became a member of the Mid-America Intercollegiate Athletics Association. UNK's home games are played at Ron & Carol Cope Stadium in Kearney, Nebraska.

== History ==
Nebraska–Kearney's football program dates back to 1905 when the program went 0–5–1. Since their inaugural season the Lopers claim 32 conference championships.

== Conference affiliations ==
- 1916–1927 Nebraska College Athletic Conference
- 1928–1942 Nebraska Intercollegiate Athletic Association
- 1943–1975 Nebraska College Conference
- 1976–1989 Central States Intercollegiate Conference
- 1990–1995 NCAA Division II independent
- 1996–2011 Rocky Mountain Athletic Conference
- 2012–present: Mid-America Intercollegiate Athletics Association

== Stadium ==
The Lopers have played their home games at Ron & Carol Cope Stadium since 1939. The current capacity of the stadium is at 5,250.

== Postseason appearances ==
=== NCAA Division II ===
The Lopers have made five appearances in the NCAA Division II playoffs, with a combined record of 2–5.

Year	Round	Opponent	Result
2002	First Round	Texas A&M–Kingsville	L, 40–58
2005	First Round	Pittsburg State	L, 20–49
2009	First Round; Second Round	Saginaw Valley; Minnesota Duluth	W, 35–20; L, 7–42
2011	Second Round	Wayne State (MI)	L, 14–38
2021	First Round; Second Round	Western Colorado; Angelo State	W, 31–24; L, 7–20

=== NAIA ===
The Lopers, then known as the Antelopes, made four appearances in the NAIA playoffs, with a combined record of 1–4.

Year	Round	Opponent	Result
1963	Semifinals	Prairie View A&M	L, 7–20
1977	Semifinals	SW Oklahoma State	L, 7–21
1979	Quarterfinals	Central State (OK)	L, 22–42
1980	Quarterfinals; Semifinals	Mars Hill; Northeastern State	W, 9–6 ^{OT} L, 0–14

== All-time record vs. current MIAA teams ==
Official record (including any NCAA imposed vacates and forfeits) against all current MIAA opponents as of the end of the 2015 season:

Opponent	Won	Lost	Tied	Percentage	Streak	First Meeting
Central Missouri	2	7	0	.222	Lost 5	1960
Central Oklahoma	2	5	0	.286	Lost 1	1979
Emporia State	12	9	0	.571	Lost 3	1975
Fort Hays State	34	29	1	.539	Lost 7	1926
Lindenwood	2	4	0	.333	Lost 3	2012
Missouri Southern	9	7	0	.563	Won 1	1977
Missouri Western	17	11	0	.607	Won 1	1970
Northeastern State	4	4	0	.500	Won 1	1960
Northwest Missouri State	3	11	0	.214	Lost 6	1928
Pittsburg State	8	12	0	.400	Lost 10	1974
Washburn	14	12	0	.538	Lost 9	1963
Totals	107	110	1	.493		
