= Nebraska Legislature 17th district =

American legislative district

Nebraska's 17th legislative district
- Map of Nebraska Legislature districts with the 17th district shaded in red
Senator
| Glen Meyer; R–Pender |
since 2025
- Demographics: 57.1% White; 4.9% Black; 26.8% Hispanic; 1.8% Asian; 11.8% Native American
- Population (2020): 40,122

The Nebraska Legislature's 17th district is one of the 49 legislative districts in the Nebraska Legislature. The district is located in northeastern Nebraska and covers all of Dakota, Thurston, Wayne and southern Dixon counties. Notable settlements in the area include South Sioux City, Dakota City, Pender, Wakefield, and Wayne. Glen Meyer has represented the district since 2025.

== Demographics ==
The US Census Bureau recorded the population as of 2020 at 40,122.

- 57.1% of the district is White.
- 26.8% of the district is Hispanic.
- 11.8% of the district is Native American.
- 4.9% of the district is Black.
- 1.8% of the district is Asian.

== List of representatives ==
| Representative | Party | Years of service | Legislature | Residence |
|---|---|---|---|---|
| Glen Meyer | Republican | 2025–present | 109th | Pender |
| Joni Albrecht | Republican | 2017–2025 | 105th-108th | Thurston |
| Dave Bloomfield | Republican | 2010–2017 | 101st-104th | Hoskins |
| Robert Giese | Democratic | 2009–2010* | 101st | South Sioux City |
| L. Patrick Engel | Republican | 1993–2009 | 93rd-100th | South Sioux City |
| Kurt Hohenstein | Republican | 1993 | 93rd | Dakota City |
| Gerald Conway | Republican | 1985–1993 | 89th-92nd | Wayne |
| Merle Von Minden | Republican | 1981–1985 | 87th-88th | Allen |
| John Murphy | Republican | 1973–1981 | 83rd-86th | South Sioux City |
| LeRoy Pfister | Democratic | 1971–1973 | 82nd | South Sioux City |
| Elmer Wallwey | Democratic | 1965–1971 | 75th-81st | Emerson |

- Robert Giese resigned before his term ended. Dave Bloomfield was appointed to fill the vacancy.
- Kurt Hohenstein resigned before his term ended. L. Patrick Engel was appointed to fill the vacancy.
- Elmer Wallwey resigned before his term ended. LeRoy Pfister was appointed to fill the vacancy.
