= The Wayne Chicken Show =

- Dates: 3 days (second weekend in July)
- Locations: Wayne, Nebraska, United States
- Coordinates: 42.2355°N 97.0178°W
- Years active: 1981–present
- Website: http://www.chickenshow.com

The Wayne Chicken Show is an annual free, family-oriented event held in Wayne, Nebraska, every second Saturday in July. It has been put on by the Wayne Area Chamber of Commerce since 1981.

== Details ==
Friday
The movement kicks off on the afternoon of the second Friday in July. A section of Main Street in Wayne closes to traffic, allowing for a street fair of sorts, called Henoween. Food stands, craft vendors, and kids' games are set up along the block. Activities that take place include the World's Largest Chicken Dance, put on by Wayne State College's cheerleading squad; the Cement Chicken Auction; a hot wing eating contest; a fireworks show put on by the Wayne Jaycees; and a teen dance.
Saturday
The Chicken Show lasts virtually all day, but the parade kicks off the main event. The parade includes over 100 entries and marches up Main Street to Bressler Park, where most of the activities are held. In the afternoon, the Wayne Rotary Club serves grilled chicken. Activities include a chicken-flying contest; a cluck-off; an egg toss; an egg drop; a hard-boiled egg-eating contest; a chicken hat contest; and a rubber chicken throwing contest.
Sunday
Main events include a car show and a poker run.

== History ==
The Wayne Chicken Show was founded in 1981 by the Wayne Regional Arts Council. They chose chickens as the main theme for three reasons: the humor associated with chickens, the general knowledge of chickens in the rural community, and the easy art ideas that could come from chickens. Themes were added to the event starting in 1984 with the theme "Break Dancing," but they did not become a regular addition until 1997. The Friday events, now known as "Henoween," were added in 1991.

== The National Cluck-Off ==
This is a contest of who can do the best chicken imitation. Requirements of the contest are that you must be heard throughout the park, you must make chicken sounds and actions, and it must last 15 seconds. Contestants from all over the country have participated in it and been nationally recognized; John Agler appeared on The Tonight Show with Johnny Carson in 1986. One winner, Joel Vavra, from Wilbur, Nebraska, was a guest on The Tonight Show with Jay Leno, and a nine-time winner, Del Hampton, was from Arkansas. Daniel Magruder of Omaha holds two 13-and-under titles, and J.T. Hobbs of Hoskins holds nine. Larry Pankoke of Linccoln has won one title.

== Awards/Features ==
Year	Award/Feature
1996	Nebraska Outstanding Tourism Award
1999	Featured in the Library of Congress
2005	2 NE State Pinnacle Awards, NE Festivals and Events, Inc.
2010	#4 on list of TripAdvisor's "America's Top 10 Wackiest Summer Events"

== List of themes ==
Year	Theme
1984	Break Dancing
1985	The 101 Year-old Chicken
1986	Best West Cowboy Chicken
1987	Chickens in the movies
1989	Chickens in Space
1990	Rock and Roll
1991	Chickens in Song
1992	Return to the Nest
1994	Poultry in Motion
1997	You Gotta Be Yolkin'
1998	Under Coop-struction
1999	Just Fowlin' Around
2000	Y2Kluck
2001	Higher Egg-ucation
2002	22 Hen Salute
2003	Wayne America's World
2004	Lewis & Cluck: Exploring Wayne, Nebraska
2005	Cheers for 25 Years
2006	Our Coop Supports the Troops
2007	Clucknology
2008	Let the Cluckin' Games Begin
2009	O'Pioneer Chickens Roosting in Wayne
2010	Wingin' It for 30 Years
2011	Chicken and a Movie
2012	Nightmare on Egg Street
2014	34 Years of Cluck Dynasty
2015	#chickenselfie2015
2016	Cluck and Roll
2017	Good Life…Great Place to Roost
2018	Welcome to Fabulous Wayne America
2019	Chickens Around the World
2020	40 Years of Egg-cellence
2021	Wayne America’s Chicken Vacation
2022	Chicken’s Guide to the Galaxy: The Meaning of Life, the Universe, and Egg-vrything
2023	Eggscaliber: Are you worthy to pluck the sword from the egg?
2024	American Pluckers: Aged to Perf-EGG-Tion
2025	Totally Rad Chicken Show
