= Elmer Wallwey =

American politician (1912–1996)

Member of the Nebraska Legislature from the 17th district
- In office January 5, 1965 – December 31, 1971
- Preceded by: Hal Bridenbaugh (redistricted)
- Succeeded by: LeRoy Pfister

Personal details
- Born: March 13, 1912 Emerson, Nebraska
- Died: February 6, 1996 (aged 83) Sioux City, Iowa
- Party: Democratic
- Spouse: Elsie Ruge (m. 1937)
- Children: 4 (Babette, Wilma, William, Marilyn)
- Education: Morningside College, Parsons College
- Occupation: Farmer

Elmer L. Wallwey (March 13, 1912 – February 6, 1996) was a Democratic politician from Nebraska who served as a member of the Nebraska Legislature from the 17th district from 1965 to 1971.

== Early life ==
Wallwey was born in Emerson, Nebraska, in 1912, and graduated from Emerson High School. He attended Morningside College and Parsons College, and maintained a farm in Emerson. Wallwey served on the local school board and was a member of the Emerson Rural Fire Protection District.

In 1954, Wallwey ran for the Dakota County Board of County Commissioners from the 3rd district, challenging incumbent Republican Commissioner George Johnson. He won the Democratic primary unopposed, and narrowly defeated Johnson in the general election.

Wallwey ran for re-election in 1958, and was challenged by Bud Vassar in the Democratic primary. Wallwey defeated Vassar by 8 votes, and advanced to the general election, where he defeated Republican Alfred Harris by a wide margin.

== Nebraska Legislature ==
In 1962, Wallwey declined to seek re-election to the Board of Commissioners. On May 9, 1962, he announced that he would run as a write-in candidate against State Senator Hal Bridenbaugh for re-election in the 13th district. He received 1,589 votes, or 32 percent of the vote, in the nonpartisan primary, and advanced to the general election against Bridenbaugh. Bridenbaugh ultimately defeated Wallwey, winning re-election, 55–45 percent.

Bridenbaugh declined to seek another term in 1964, and Wallwey ran to succeed him in the redrawn 17th district. In the primary, he faced Vernon Brasch and Vern Morgan, both of whom were farmers. Wallwey received 49 percent of the vote in the primary, and faced Morgan, who received 38 percent, in the general election. Wallwey ultimately defeated Brasch, winning 55 percent of the vote to Brasch's 45 percent.

In 1968, Wallwey ran for re-election. He was challenged by Kenrick Mitchell, the superintendent of schools in Allen; Wayne City Councilman Aaron Butler; and businessman John Murphy. In the primary election, Wallwey placed first, winning 40 percent of the vote, and advanced to the general election Murphy, who narrowly placed second with 27 percent of the vote. In the general election, Wallwey defeated Murphy by a wide margin, winning 57–43 percent.

== Post-legislative career ==
Wallwey was appointed as the regional director of the Nebraska Office of Mental Retardation in 1971 by Governor J. James Exon, and resigned from the legislature on December 31, 1971. He served from 1972 until 1975.

== Death ==
Wallwey died on February 6, 1996.
