= Louis Jeppesen =

American politician (1891–1975)

Member of the Nebraska Legislature from the 13th district
- In office January 7, 1941 – January 2, 1945
- Preceded by: J. B. Rossiter
- Succeeded by: Roy Carlberg

Member of the Nebraska House of Representatives from the 24th district
- In office January 1, 1935 – January 5, 1937
- Preceded by: Victor McGonigle
- Succeeded by: Position abolished

Personal details
- Born: February 19, 1891 Denmark
- Died: January 15, 1975 (aged 83) Homer, Nebraska
- Party: Republican
- Spouse: Marie Nelson (m. 1917)
- Education: Wayne State Teachers College
- Occupation: Farmer

Louis M. Jeppesen (February 19, 1891 – January 15, 1975) was a Republican politician from Nebraska who served as a member of the Nebraska House of Representatives from 1935 to 1937 and as a member of the Nebraska Legislature from the 13th district from 1941 to 1945.

== Early life ==
Jeppesen was born in Denmark in 1891 and immigrated to the United States in 1910. He attended Wayne State Teachers College and was a farmer.

== Nebraska House of Representatives ==
In 1934, Jeppesen was elected to the Nebraska House of Representatives from the 24th district as a Republican, defeating incumbent State Representative Victor McGonigle, a Democrat. He left office in 1937, after the State House and Senate were consolidated into the unicameral legislature.

== Nebraska Legislature ==
In 1940, when State Senator J. B. Rossiter declined to seek re-election, Jeppesen ran to succeed him in the 13th district, which included Dakota, Dixon, and Thurston counties.. In the nonpartisan primary, he placed second with 22 percent of the vote, and advanced to the general election with teacher Ruth Zimmerman, who received 23 percent. In the general election, he defeated her with 56 percent of the vote.

Jeppesen ran for re-election in 1942, and was challenged by former State Representative Chet Campbell, Rex Smith, and William Gutzman. Jeppesen received 39 percent of the vote in the primary, and advanced to the general election with Campbell, who placed second with 27 percent. Jeppesen defeated Campbell in the general election, winning his second term, 54–46 percent.

In 1944, Jeppesen sought a third term, and was challenged by attorney Roy Carlberg and J. H. Montgomery. Jeppesen placed first in the primary with 44 percent of the vote, while Carlberg narrowly defeated Montgomery to win second, receiving receiving 30 percent of the vote to Montgomery's 26 percent. Carlberg ultimately defeated Jeppesen in the general election by a 48-vote margin.

== Post-legislative career ==
Jeppesen challenged Carlberg for re-election in 1946, but lost the general election to Carlberg, receiving 48 percent of the vote to his 52 percent. In 1952, Jeppesen re-entered politics, and challenged State Senator Hal Bridenbaugh for re-election, but ultimately dropped out before the primary, leaving Bridenbaugh unopposed.

In 1952, the Knights of Ak-Sar-Ben named Louis and Marie Jeppesen as the recipients of their Good Neighbor Award for housing orphaned and disabled children in their family home.

== Death ==
Jeppesen died on January 15, 1975.
