= Roy Carlberg =

American politician (1882–1975)

Member of the Nebraska Legislature from the 13th district
- In office January 2, 1945 – January 4, 1949
- Preceded by: Louis Jeppesen
- Succeeded by: Hal Bridenbaugh

Personal details
- Born: February 1, 1882 Blair, Nebraska
- Died: February 24, 1975 (aged 93) Pender, Nebraska
- Party: Republican
- Spouse: Dora Hinrich (m. 1917)
- Children: 4
- Education: University of Nebraska College of Law
- Occupation: Lawyer

Roy B. Carlberg (February 1, 1882 – February 24, 1975) was a Republican politician from Nebraska who served as a member of the Nebraska Legislature from the 13th district from 1945 to 1949.

== Early life ==
Carlberg was born in Blair, Nebraska, in 1882, and graduated from Bancroft High School. He attended the University of Nebraska College of Law, and practiced law in Pender. In 1914, Carlberg was elected to the Thurston County Judge. He ran for re-election in 1918, and was defeated.

== Nebraska Legislature ==
In 1944, State Senator Louis Jeppesen ran for re-election in the 13th district, which included Dakota, Dixon, and Thurston counties. Carlberg challenged Jeppesen for re-election. In the nonpartisan primary, Jeppesen placed first, winning 44 percent of the vote. Carlberg narrowly beat J. H. Montgomery for second place, receiving 30 percent of the vote to Montgomery's 26 percent. Jeppesen and Carlberg advanced to the general election, which Carlberg won by a narrow margin, defeating Jeppesen by 48 votes.

Carlberg ran for re-election in 1946. In a rematch of the 1944 election, both Jeppesen and Montgomery filed to run against Carlberg. In the primary, Carlberg narrowly placed first, winning 41 percent of the vote and receiving 18 more votes than Jeppesen. Carlberg and Jeppesen proceeded to the general election. Carlberg narrowly defeated Jeppesen, winning re-election, 52–48 percent.

In 1948, Carlberg ran for re-election to a third term. He was challenged by farmer Hal Bridenbaugh, and in the primary election, Bridenbaugh narrowly placed first, receiving 53 percent of the vote to Carlberg's 47 percent, and they proceeded to the general election. One month prior to the general election, Carlberg requested a form from the Nebraska Secretary of State's office to withdraw from the election, but ultimately opted to continue his campaign. Bridenbaugh ultimately defeated Carlberg, winning 51 percent of the vote to his 49 percent.

== Post-legislative career ==
After leaving the legislature, Carlberg continued his legal practice in Pender. In 1950, Carlberg was elected to the Nebraska Republican Party convention.

== Death ==
Carlberg died on February 24, 1975.
