= Wayne Commercial Historic District =

Historic district in Nebraska, United States

- U.S. National Register of Historic Places
- U.S. Historic district
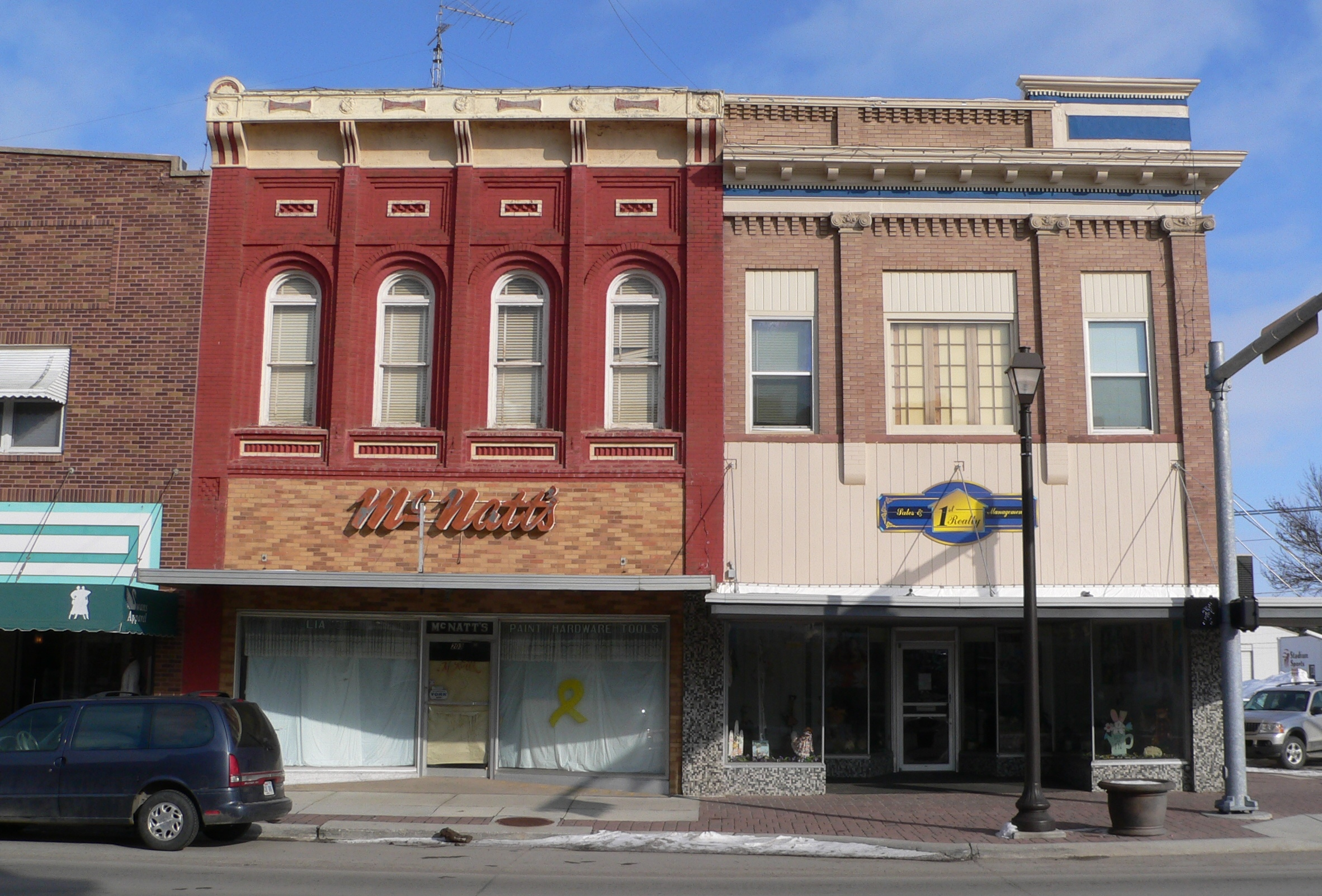

- Location within Nebraska Location within the United States
- Location: S. Main, N. Main and 2nd St., Wayne, Nebraska
- Coordinates: 42.230278°N 97.017783°W
- Area: 13 acres (5.3 ha)
- Architectural style: Late 19th and 20th Century Revivals, Late 19th And Early 20th Century American Movements
- NRHP reference No.: 09001071
- Added to NRHP: December 8, 2009

The Wayne Commercial Historic District in Wayne in Wayne County, Nebraska is a 13 acres (5.3 ha) historic district which was listed on the National Register of Historic Places in 2009.

It includes 68 buildings, of which 44 are contributing buildings, along portions of S. Main, N. Main, and 2nd St., including the city hall. It includes Late 19th and 20th Century Revivals and Late 19th And Early 20th Century American Movements architecture.

== Historic buildings ==
- P.V. Elevator Company grain elevator (1889), South Main Street
- Freight Depot (1883), 110 South Main Street
- Passenger Depot (1912), 106 South Main Street, a one‐story brick building
- Old City Hall (1912), 115 West 2nd Street, includes Neo Classical details, was renovated for use as Wayne's fire department
- Old First National Bank (c.1890), 202 North Main Street, a two‐story building constructed of red brick with reddish‐orange stone accents. It has a decorated cornice and a brick masonry parapet.
