= Meisch =

Meisch is a surname. Notable people with the surname include:

- Claude Meisch (born 1971), Luxembourgish politician
- Dietmar Meisch (born 1959), East German race walker

== See also ==
- Meisch House
