= NSCS =

NSCS may refer to:

- National Society of Collegiate Scholars, US
- NASCAR Sprint Cup Series
- National security councils
- National Security Council Secretariat, India
- Nebraska State College System
