= L. C. Nuernberger =

American politician (1879–1951)

Member of the Nebraska Legislature from the 13th district
- In office January 5, 1937 – January 3, 1939
- Preceded by: Position created
- Succeeded by: J. B. Rossiter

Member of the Nebraska House of Representatives from the 25th district
- In office January 1, 1935 – January 5, 1937
- Preceded by: Nels Bostrom
- Succeeded by: Position abolished
- In office January 6, 1931 – January 3, 1933
- Preceded by: James F. Kendall
- Succeeded by: Nels Bostrom

Personal details
- Born: February 16, 1879 Buckley, Illinois
- Died: December 25, 1951 (aged 72) Wakefield, Nebraska
- Party: Republican
- Spouse: Amy Leonard (m. 1907)
- Children: 4
- Education: Nebraska Normal College; University of Nebraska
- Occupation: Merchant, banker

Louis C. Nuernberger (February 16, 1879 – December 25, 1951) was a Republican politician from Nebraska who served as a member of the Nebraska House of Representatives from the 25th district from 1931 to 1933 and again from 1935 to 1937, and as a member of the Nebraska Legislature from the 13th district from 1937 to 1939.

== Early life ==
Nuernberger was born in Buckley, Illinois, in 1879, and moved to Nebraska as a child in 1883. He grew up in Wakefield, and attended Nebraska Normal College University of Nebraska. He owned and operated Nuernberger's, a retail store in Wakefield, from 1904 to 1924, and later served as the vice president of a local bank and on the city board of education.

== Nebraska House of Representatives ==
In 1930, Nuernberger ran for the Nebraska House of Representatives from the 25th district, and defeated incumbent State Representative James F. Kendall in the Republican primary, and was unopposed in the general election.

Nuernberger was challenged by Democrat Nels Bostrom in 1932, and was narrowly defeated, winning 48 percent of the vote to Bostrom's 52 percent. When Bostrom ran for re-election, Nuernberger challenged him, and won the general election with 58 percent of the vote.

== Nebraska Legislaturę ==
In 1936, when the State House and State Senate were consolidated into the unicameral legislature, Nuernberger ran in the newly created 13th district. He faced State Representative J. W. Reilly and former State Representative Victor McGonigle in the nonpartisan primary. Nuernberger and Reilly advanced to the general election, which Nuernberger won with 60 percent of the vote.

Nuernberger ran for re-election in 1938. He was challenged by J. B. Rossiter and former State Representative Frank Klopping. Rossiter placed first in the primary, winning 50 percent of the vote to Nuernberger's 40 percent, and they advanced to the general election. Rossiter ultimately defeated Nuernberger with 55 percent of the vote.

== Personal life ==
Nuernberger and his wife, Amy, had four children. His son, Marvin, was appointed State Engineer in 1968 by Governor Norbert Tiemann.

== Death ==
Nuernberger died on December 25, 1951.
