= Merle Von Minden =

American politician (1926–2017)

Member of the Nebraska Legislature from the 17th district
- In office January 7, 1981 – January 9, 1985
- Preceded by: John Murphy
- Succeeded by: Gerald Conway

Personal details
- Born: June 8, 1926 Martinsburg, Nebraska
- Died: July 17, 2017 (aged 91) Allen, Nebraska
- Party: Republican
- Spouse: Deenette Good (m. 1955)
- Children: 3 (LeAnn, Scott, Lori)
- Occupation: Farmer-feeder

Merle H. Von Minden (June 8, 1926 – July 17, 2017) was a Republican politician from Nebraska who served as a member of the Nebraska Legislature from the 17th district from 1981 to 1985.

== Early life ==
Von Minden was born in Martinsburg, Nebraska, in 1926. He graduated from Ponca High School and served in the U.S. Army during the Korean War. Von Minden was elected to the Allen School Board and then to the Dixon County Board of Supervisors.

== Nebraska Legislature ==
In 1980, Van Minden ran to succeed State Senator John Murphy in the 17th district, which was based in Dakota, Dixon, and Wayne counties. In the nonpartisan primary, he faced college professor Gerald Conway, farmer Edwin Fahrenzhold, former Wayne Board of Education member Frederick Mann, and businessman Eugene O'Neill. Conway placed first in the primary, winning 25 percent of the vote. Von Minden only narrowly defeated Fahrenholz for second place, winning by 12 votes after a mandatory recount. In the general election, Von Minden defeated Conway by just two hundred votes, winning 51–49 percent.

Von Minden ran for re-election in 1984, and faced Conway in a rematch. In the primary election, Von Minden placed first, winning 59 percent of the vote to Conway's 41 percent. Conway narrowly defeated Von Minden, receiving 51 percent of the vote to his 49 percent.

== Death ==
Von Linden died on July 17, 2017.
