= Hal Bridenbaugh =

American politician (1891–1988)

Member of the Nebraska Legislature from the 13th district
- In office January 4, 1949 – January 5, 1965
- Preceded by: Roy Carlberg
- Succeeded by: Elmer Wallwey (redistricting)

Personal details
- Born: November 26, 1891 Dakota City, Nebraska
- Died: May 28, 1988 (aged 96) South Sioux City, Nebraska
- Party: Republican
- Spouse: Ruth V. Kline (m. 1916)
- Children: 2
- Education: Iowa State College
- Occupation: Farmer

Hal Bridenbaugh (November 26, 1891 – May 28, 1988) was a Republican politician from Nebraska who served as a member of the Nebraska Legislature from the 13th district from 1949 to 1965.

== Early life ==
Bridenbaugh was born in Dakota City, Nebraska, in 1891, and grew up in Dakota City and Sioux City, Iowa. He graduated from Sioux City Central High School, and attended Iowa State College. Bridenbaugh settled in Dakota City, where he was a livestock farmer ad served on the city school board.

== Nebraska Legislature ==
In 1948, Bridenbaugh ran for the Nebraska Legislature from the 13th district, challenging incumbent State Senator Roy Carlberg for re-election. In the nonpartisan primary, Bridenbaugh received 53 percent of the vote to Carlberg's 47 percent, and they advanced to the general election. Prior to election day, Carlberg considered ending his campaign, and requested a withdrawal form from the Nebraska Secretary of State, but continued his campaign, narrowly losing to Bridenbaugh, who received 51 percent of the vote.

Bridenbaugh was re-elected unopposed in 1950. In 1952, former State Senator Louis Jeppesen challenged Bridenbaugh for re-election, but Jeppesen dropped out of the race before the primary election, and Bridenbaugh was re-elected unopposed.

In 1954, Bridenbaugh ran for re-election to a fourth term, and he was challenged by farmer J. S. Rihanek. Bridenbaugh won 64 percent of the vote in the primary election, and defeated Rihanek in the general election, receiving 63 percent of the vote to Rihanek's 37 percent. He was re-elected unopposed in 1956 and 1958.

Bridenbaugh ran for an eighth term in 1960, and was challenged by former Dakota County Assessor F. A. Buser. In the primary, Bridenbaugh received 72 percent of the vote to Buser's 28 percent. They proceeded to the general election, which Bridenbaugh won with 73 percent of the vote.

In 1962, Bridenbaugh ran for re-election, and faced no opponents on the ballot. However, Dakota County Supervisor Elmer Wallwey announced that he would challenge Bridenbaugh as a write-in candidate. Wallwey received 1,589 votes, of 32 percent of the vote, and received a place on the general election ballot. Bridenbaugh defeated Wallwey with 55 percent of the vote.

Bridenbaugh declined to seek re-election in 1964.

== Death ==
Bridenbaugh died on May 28, 1988.
