= Bridenbaugh =

Bridenbaugh is a surname. Notable people with the surname include:

- Carl Bridenbaugh (1903–1992), American historian
- Hal Bridenbaugh (1891–1998), American politician from Nebraska
- Philip Henry Bridenbaugh (1890–1990), American football player and coach
