= Senator Giese =

Senator Giese may refer to:

- Robert Giese (born 1955), Nebraska State Senate
- Warren Giese (1924–2013), South Carolina State Senate
