= Meisch House =

Historic house in Nebraska, United States

- U.S. National Register of Historic Places
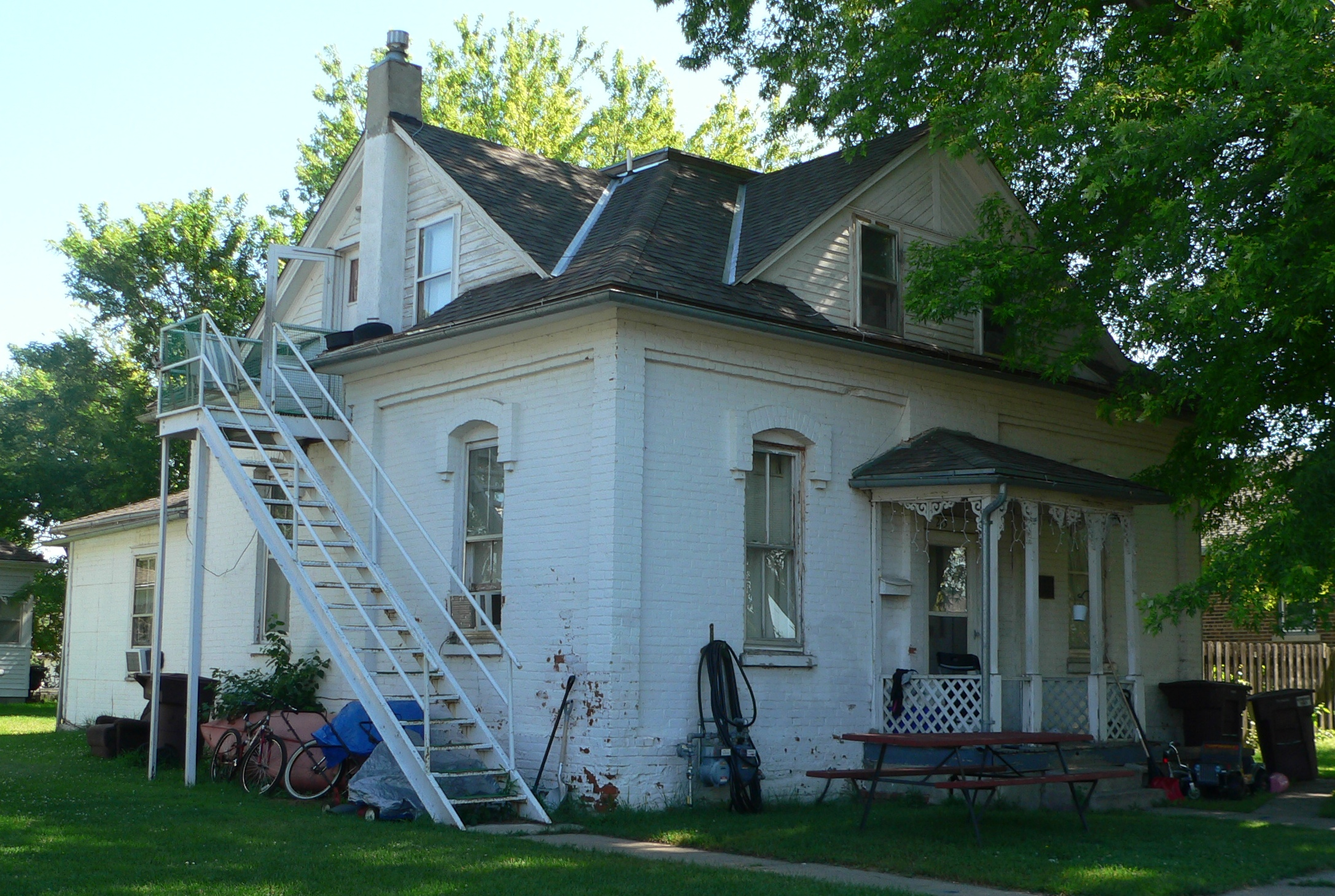

- Location within Nebraska Location within the United States
- Location: 213 Seventeenth St., South Sioux City, Nebraska
- Coordinates: 42°28′26″N 96°24′54″W
- Area: less than one acre
- Built: 1888
- Built by: Meisch, Peter
- Architectural style: Square-house type
- NRHP reference No.: 86000387
- Added to NRHP: March 13, 1986

The Meisch House, also known as the Garlack House, was built in 1888 in Dakota County, Nebraska and was listed on the National Register of Historic Places in 1986.

It was built as a square-plan 38 feet (12 m) by 38 feet (12 m) house by local brickmaker Peter Meisch. A kitchen wing was added later.

== See also ==
- American Foursquare, a more complex square-plan architecture
