= John Murphy (Nebraska politician) =

American politician (1918–2010)

John R. Murphy

Member of the Nebraska Legislature from the 17th district
- In office January 2, 1973 – January 7, 1981
- Preceded by: LeRoy Pfister
- Succeeded by: Merle Von Minden

Personal details
- Born: September 5, 1918 South Sioux City, Nebraska
- Died: April 21, 2010 (aged 91) Kearney, Missouri
- Party: Republican
- Spouse: Mary Elizabeth "Bess" Forbes (m. 1947)
- Children: 2 (Kim, Brian)
- Education: University of Iowa (B.A.)
- Occupation: Propane distribution and sales

John Robert Murphy (September 5, 1918 – April 21, 2010) was a Republican politician from Nebraska who served as a member of the Nebraska Legislature from the 17th district from 1973 to 1981.

== Early life ==
Murphy was born in South Sioux City, Nebraska, and attended the University of Iowa, graduating with his bachelor's degree. He served in the U.S. Naval Reserve during World War II. Murphy worked as a traveling salesman for Graybar, an electronic manufacturer, and owned and operated a propane company that he sold to Northern Natural Gas, and later worked for Northern to establish new propane plants.

== Nebraska Legislature ==
In 1972, Murphy ran for the legislature from the 17th district, which was based in Dakota, Dixon, and Wayne counties, challenging appointed Senator LeRoy Pfister. In the nonpartisan primary, Murphy placed first over Pfister, winning 30 percent of the vote to Pfister's 29 percent, while Elaine Schmadeke placed third with 21 percent and Chris Miller won 20 percent. Murphy defeated Pfister in the general election, winning 53–47 percent.

Murphy ran for re-election in 1976. He was challenged for re-election by Gil Fournier, a Wayne State College student, who failed to file a campaign finance report or respond to media inquiries. In the primary, Murphy placed first over Fournier in a landslide, receiving 79 percent of the vote. Fournier subsequently withdrew from the race. Over the summer, however, Aaron Butler, a community college instructor and education management consultant, announced that he would gather signatures to challenge Murphy on the November ballot. Butler attacked Murphy's record in the legislature, focusing on his abstention from voting to override Governor J. James Exon's veto of a $15 million increased appropriation for state school funding. However, Murphy defeated Butler in a landslide, winning his second term, 73–27 percent.

While serving in the legislature, Murphy, who suffered from diabetes, experienced significant vision loss, and his wife, Bess, sat with him to read bills and other legislative materials to him.

During a special legislative session in 1978, Murphy came to the Senate chamber dressed as a clown and carrying balloons, characterizing the special session as a "charade" and stating, "I felt it appropriate to dress for the occasion." Lieutenant Governor Gerald Whelan, presiding over the Senate, gaveled Murphy out of order, and senators later pointed to the incident as inconsistent with the legislature's "new era of maturity, professionalism and responsibility."

Murphy declined to seek re-election in 1980.

== Death ==
Murphy died on April 21, 2010.
