= L. Patrick Engel =

American politician (1932–2022)

Chair of the Executive Board of the Nebraska Legislature
- In office January 8, 2003 – January 7, 2009
- Preceded by: George Coordsen
- Succeeded by: John Wightman

Member of the Nebraska Legislature from the 17th district
- In office 1993–2009
- Preceded by: Kurt Hohenstein
- Succeeded by: Robert Giese

Personal details
- Born: May 18, 1932 South Sioux City, Nebraska, U.S.
- Died: December 5, 2022 (aged 90) South Sioux City, Nebraska, U.S.
- Party: Democratic (before 2006); Republican (after 2006)
- Education: University of Nebraska

Leo Patrick Engel (May 18, 1932 – December 5, 2022) was an American politician from the state of Nebraska. A resident of South Sioux City, Engel served four terms in the Nebraska Legislature, from 1993 to 2009.

Engel was born on May 18, 1932, in South Sioux City. He graduated from the South Sioux City Public Schools and the University of Nebraska. He served in the U.S. Air Force as an intelligence officer. He served on the school boards of St. Michael's and of South Sioux City, and as a Dakota county commissioner.

Engel was appointed to represent the 17th District in the Nebraska State Legislature on September 1, 1993, replacing Kurt Hohenstein. He was then elected to the seat in 1994, and reelected in 1996, 2000, and 2004.

In the Legislature, Engel chaired the Executive Board and the Reference Committee, and sat on the Appropriations Committee and the Legislative Performance Audit Committee.

Engel died on December 5, 2022, at the age of 90.
