= K92 =

K 92 may refer to:

- K-92 (Kansas highway), highway in Kansas

Also the moniker of at least three radio stations in the U.S.:

- WXLK-FM 92.3 FM in Roanoke, Virginia (Top 40)
- WWKA also 92.3 FM in Orlando, Florida (Country)
- KWSC 91.9 FM in Wayne, Nebraska (Wayne State College)
- KSYN 92.5 FM in Joplin, Missouri (Top 40) (former incarnation)
