= Dakota County v. Glidden =

- Supreme Court of the United States

Argued January 5, 1885 Decided January 26, 1885
- Full case name: Dakota County v. Glidden
- Citations: 113 U.S. 222 (more) 5 S. Ct. 428; 28 L. Ed. 981

Holding
- A civil settlement extinguishes the controversy in a case and deprives courts of jurisdiction to make further decisions.

Court membership
- Chief Justice Morrison Waite Associate Justices Samuel F. Miller · Stephen J. Field; Joseph P. Bradley · John M. Harlan; William B. Woods · Stanley Matthews; Horace Gray · Samuel Blatchford

Case opinion
- Majority: Miller, joined by unanimous

Dakota County v. Glidden, 113 U.S. 222 (1885), was a United States Supreme Court case in which the court held that a civil settlement extinguishes a controversy and deprives courts of jurisdiction to make further decisions.

== Background ==
The case arose upon a motion to dismiss a suit issued in aid of a railroad. Judgment for the plaintiff. The defendant brought a writ of error to reverse it. Subsequently, to the judgment, Dakota County, Nebraska settled with the plaintiff and other bondholders, by giving them new bonds bearing a less rate of interest, and the old bonds, which were the cause of action in this suit, were surrendered and destroyed.

== Supreme Court ==
The case came to the Supreme Court on a writ of error, and a party entered a motion to dismiss that writ of error. The Supreme Court heard of the settlement via affidavits and transcripts from the county records that accompanied that motion to dismiss the writ of error.

The Supreme Court decided that, while payment of the sum recovered in submission to the judgment is no bar to the right of reversal of the judgment when brought here by writ of error, a compromise and settlement of the demand in suit, whereby a new agreement is substituted in place of the old one, extinguishes the cause of action, and leaves nothing for the exercise of the jurisdiction of this Court.

Indeed, the county tried to have the appellate courts ignore the settlement and decide the underlying questions because recognizing the settlement would require the appellate court to "to assume original instead of appellate jurisdiction." Contrary to the truism that appellate courts do not engage in new fact finding, the Supreme Court rejected the County's theory, saying "[T]his court is compelled, as all courts are, to receive evidence [from outside] the record affecting their proceeding in a case before them" when the court deems such fact-finding necessary. Accordingly, the court found that the settlement had been reached and dismissed the case as moot.
