= J. B. Rossiter =

American politician (1890–1950)

Member of the Nebraska Legislature from the 13th district
- In office January 3, 1939 – January 7, 1941
- Preceded by: L. C. Nuernberger
- Succeeded by: Louis Jeppesen

Personal details
- Born: June 15, 1890 Bancroft, Nebraska
- Died: December 29, 1950 (aged 60) Walthill, Nebraska
- Party: Democratic
- Spouse: Effie Starbuck (m. 1927)
- Children: 2
- Education: Mozer-Lampman Business College
- Occupation: Court reporter, banker

James Bert Rossiter (June 15, 1890 – December 29, 1950) was a Democratic politician from Nebraska who served as a member of the Nebraska Legislature from the 13th district from 1939 to 1941.

== Early life ==
Rossiter was born in Bancroft, Nebraska, in 1890. After graduating from grade school, he worked as a clerk at the Bureau of Indian Affairs office in Macy. Rossiter later attended Mozer-Lampman Business College in Omaha and worked as a court reporter under Judge Guy T. Graves in Hartington. He settled in Walthill, where he served as the president of the First National Bank and was chairman of the Thurston County Democratic Party7.

== Nebraska Legislature ==
In 1938, Rossiter ran for the state legislature, challenging State Senator L. C. Nuernberger for re-election in the 13th district. In the nonpartisan primary, Rossiter placed first, receiving 50 percent of the vote to Nuerbnerger's 40 percent and former State Representative Frank Klopping's 10 percent. In the general election, Rossiter defeated Nuernberger, winning 55–45 percent.

Rossiter declined to seek re-election in 1940.

== Death ==
Rossiter died on December 29, 1950.
