= Robert Giese =

American politician (born 1955)

Member of the Nebraska Legislature from the 17th district
- In office 2009–2010
- Preceded by: L. Patrick Engel
- Succeeded by: Dave Bloomfield

Personal details
- Born: July 6, 1955 (age 71) Sioux City, Iowa
- Party: Democratic

Robert Giese (born July 6, 1955, in Sioux City, Iowa) is a politician from the U.S. state of Nebraska. A resident of South Sioux City, he served part of a term in the Nebraska Legislature.

Giese was mayor of South Sioux City. In 2008, he was elected to represent the 17th Nebraska legislative district in the Legislature. He sat on the Education, Government, Military and Veterans Affairs, and State-Tribal Relations committees. He resigned from his legislative seat after being elected Dakota County treasurer in 2010.
