= Dave Bloomfield =

American politician

Member of the Nebraska Legislature from the 17th district
- In office January 5, 2011 – January 4, 2017
- Preceded by: Robert Giese
- Succeeded by: Joni Albrecht

Personal details
- Born: January 9, 1946 (age 80) Sioux City, Iowa, U.S.
- Party: Republican
- Spouse: Dee Boeckenhauer (m. 1996)
- Children: 4

Dave Bloomfield (born January 9, 1946) is an American politician from Hoskins, Nebraska, who was a state senator in the Nebraska Legislature.

== Early life and education ==
Bloomfield grew up on a small farm in Dakota County, Nebraska. His father died when Bloomfield was only 8 years old, and his mother raised four children alone on the farm. Bloomfield graduated from South Sioux City High School in 1964. From 1966 to 1968 he fought in Vietnam as a member of the U.S. Army. His brother, father, great-grandfather, and youngest son also served in the U.S. military. After the war he became a truck driver and a farmer. Prior to his appointment to the legislature, he was a member of the Jackson, Nebraska school board and the chairman of the Wayne County Republican Party.

== Career ==
=== State legislature ===
Bloomfield was appointed by Republican Governor Dave Heineman in 2010 to represent District 17 in the Legislature after the resignation of Robert Giese. He was reelected to the legislature in 2012. On May 15, 2012, he won 52.9% of the votes in the primary election, and on November 6, 2012, he won 61% of the votes in the general election, defeating Van Philips. For this election, he received donations from Nebraska Bankers Association, Nebraska Dental Association, Nebraska Realtors Association, and Iowa Nebraska Equipment Deals Association In the 2011 to 2012 legislative session, Bloomfield served on the Agriculture, General Affairs, and Health and Human Services Committees. In 2013-2014 legislative session he served on the Agricultural, General Affairs, and Government, Military and Veterans Affairs Committees. He was an opponent of a bill allowing cities in Nebraska to collect 2% sales tax, up from 1.5%. Bloomfield left the legislature in 2017 because of term limits.

==== Legislative action ====
On January 14, 2013, Bloomfield introduced his first bill LB171 which would provide for an expedited concealed handgun permit process for applicants who are victims of domestic violence. The bill was indefinitely postponed April 17, 2014. Bloomfield introduced his most debated bill LB393 on January 18, 2013, which would give motorcycle riders 21 years and older the option not to wear a helmet. As of April 17, 2014 the bill has been indefinitely postponed One bill introduced by Bloomfield has passed. LB766 changed tuition assistance program provisions for National Guard members. National Guard members would receive credit for seventy five percent of resident tuition for attending a state-supported college or university in Nebraska. Bloomfield introduced this bill on January 9, 2014, and it was passed April 10, 2014.

== Personal life ==
Bloomfield married Dee Boeckenhauer, a retired special education teacher on May 25, 1996. He has four children: Christina Mundil, Charles Bloomfield, Beth Brader, and Mark Bloomfield. He also has a big, beautiful grandson named Bryen Bloomfield.
