= Goodwin, Nebraska =

Unincorporated community in Nebraska, United States

- Unincorporated community
- Location within Nebraska Location within the United States
- Coordinates: 42°27′19″N 96°39′19″W
- Country: United States
- State: Nebraska
- County: Dakota
- Elevation: 1,175 ft (358 m)
- Time zone: UTC-6 (Central (CST))
  - Summer (DST): UTC-5 (CDT)
- Area code: 402
- GNIS feature ID: 835313

Goodwin is an unincorporated community in Dakota County, Nebraska, United States.

== History ==
Goodwin was established in 1892. It was named for John C. Goodwin, a railroad official. A post office was established at Goodwin in 1892, and remained in operation until it was discontinued in 1940.
