= Atokad Downs =

Horse racing facility in South Sioux City, Nebraska

Coordinates: 42.442087°N 96.429950°W

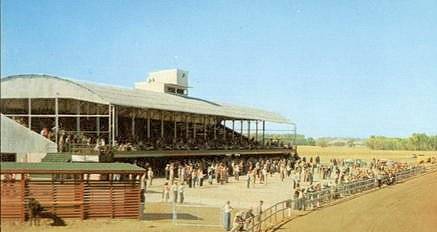
Atokad Downs in South Sioux City, NE

Atokad Downs is a horse racing facility in South Sioux City, Nebraska. The original 5/8 mile track was built in 1956 at a cost of $250,000 and featured grandstands for 2,600 spectators and barns for 500 horses.

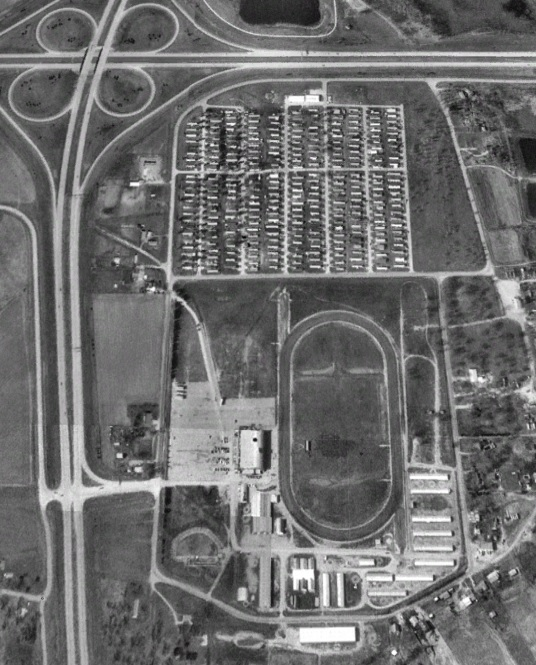
Aerial view of the facility in 1993

Atokad (Dakota spelled backwards) ran live racing continuously until 2012, when only one live race was held to keep their simulcast rights for the remainder of the year. That year, the Ho-Chunk tribe purchased the property and closed the track with future plans to open a casino on the site. Ho-Chunk resumed live racing in 2016 with one meeting on a shortened one furlong track, and continued to hold one meeting each year on this track until 2025 when racing was moved to a new 5/8 mile track a short distance away.
