= Thomas M. Carsey =

American political scientist (1966–2018)

Thomas M. Carsey (January 20, 1966 – February 21, 2018) was an American political scientist.

Carsey earned his bachelor's and master's degree from Wayne State College before receiving a Ph.D from Indiana University Bloomington. He began teaching at University of Illinois at Chicago, then joined the faculty of Florida State University in 2000. He was named the Thomas J. Pearsall Distinguished Professor in political science at the University of North Carolina Chapel Hill. The Thomas M. Carsey Scholarship in Data Science at UNC was named for him. Carsey died of amyotrophic lateral sclerosis, aged 52, on February 21, 2018.
