= KWSC =

Radio station in Wayne, Nebraska

- Wayne, Nebraska; United States
- Frequency: 91.9 MHz
- Branding: 91.9 the Cat

Programming
- Format: Alternative

Ownership
- Owner: Wayne State College

Technical information
- Licensing authority: FCC
- Facility ID: 71191
- Class: A
- ERP: 320 watts
- HAAT: 29.0 meters (95.1 ft)
- Transmitter coordinates: 42°14′30.00″N 97°0′48.00″W

Links
- Public license information: Public file; LMS
- Webcast: Listen live
- Website: Official Website

KWSC (91.9 FM, "91.9 the Cat") is a college radio in Wayne, Nebraska broadcasting an alternative music format. The station is licensed to Wayne State College.

== History ==
While Wayne State College has been involved in experimental radio as early as 1916 within the Department of Physical Sciences, the permanent student-run station, KWSC-FM, officially signed on the air on October 13, 1971. The station originally broadcast with 160 watts in monaural sound and was branded as "Mono 92" before transitioning to "KWSC92, Where the Squirrels Come to Rock" in the 1990s. In 2007, the station adopted its current "91.9 The Cat" identity to align with the college's athletic branding.

In recent years, KWSC-FM has gained international and national acclaim for its broadcasting excellence. In 2024 and 2025, the station was one of only ten college radio stations globally to receive the Spirit of College Radio Award from the College Radio Foundation. This award recognizes stations that demonstrate exceptional community impact and innovative programming, specifically during World College Radio Day.

Additionally, at the 2025 College Broadcasters Inc. (CBI) National Student Production Awards in Denver, the station won two first-place national awards.

The station is known for its "service-learning" initiatives, most notably its annual 24-hour Twitch livestream marathon.
