= Nacora, Nebraska =

Unincorporated community in Nebraska, United States

- Unincorporated community
- Location within Nebraska Location within the United States
- Coordinates: 42°19′07″N 96°39′39″W
- Country: United States
- State: Nebraska
- County: Dakota
- Elevation: 1,411 ft (430 m)
- Time zone: UTC-6 (Central (CST))
  - Summer (DST): UTC-5 (CDT)
- Area code: 402
- GNIS feature ID: 835388

Nacora is an unincorporated community in Dakota County, Nebraska, United States.

== History ==
Nacora is derived from a Spanish word meaning "I am born." A post office opened in Nacora in 1892, closed in 1894, reopened in 1898, and closed permanently in 1943.
