= 1996 United States presidential election in Nebraska =

- November 5, 1996

Nominee	Bob Dole	Bill Clinton	Ross Perot
Party	Republican	Democratic	Reform
Home state	Kansas	Arkansas	Texas
Running mate	Jack Kemp	Al Gore	Pat Choate
Electoral vote	5	0	0
Popular vote	363,467	236,761	71,278
Percentage	53.65%	34.95%	10.52%

Dole
40–50%
50–60%
60–70%
70–80%
Clinton
40–50%
President before election
Bill Clinton
Democratic
Elected President
Bill Clinton
Democratic

The 1996 United States presidential election in Nebraska took place on November 5, 1996. All 50 states and the District of Columbia were part of the 1996 United States presidential election. Voters chose five electors to the Electoral College, which selected the president and vice president.

Nebraska is one of the two states (the other being Maine) to award electoral votes by the winner of each congressional district.

Kansas Senator Bob Dole won the statewide vote by a 18.7% margin against incumbent United States President Bill Clinton of Arkansas. Dole also won all 3 congressional districts, thus winning all 5 of the states electoral votes.

Nebraska weighed in for this election as 27.22 percentage points more Republican than the national average. This would be the last presidential election until 2012 when the Democratic candidate won the general election without carrying Nebraska's second congressional district. The presidential election of 1996 was a very multi-partisan election for Nebraska, with more than 11 percent of the electorate voting for third-party candidates. As was typical for the time, nearly every county in Nebraska turned out primarily for the Republican candidate, with the exception of Saline County, which had long been the most Democratic county in the state, plus two northeastern counties with substantial Hispanic or Native American populations. As of the 2024 presidential election, this is the last election in which Dakota County voted for a Democratic presidential candidate.

With 53.65 percent of the popular vote, Nebraska would prove to be Dole's third strongest state in the 1996 election after Utah and neighboring Kansas.

In his second bid for the presidency, Ross Perot led the newly formed Reform Party to gain over 10% of the votes in Nebraska, and to pull in support nationally as the most popular third-party (not including independents) candidate to run for United States Presidency in recent times. Arthur County was one of only two counties in which Perot came in second place in 1996, ahead of one of the two major-party nominees, the other being Loving County, Texas.

== Results ==
1996 United States presidential election in Nebraska
Party	Candidate	Votes	Percentage	Electoral votes
Republican	Bob Dole	363,467	53.65%	5
Democratic	Bill Clinton (incumbent)	236,761	34.95%	0
Reform	Ross Perot	71,278	10.52%	0
Libertarian	Harry Browne	2,792	0.41%	0
Independent	Howard Phillips	1,928	0.28%	0
Natural Law	John Hagelin	1,189	0.18%	0
Totals		677,415	100.00%	5
Voter turnout (voting age/registered)				

=== Congressional district ===
Dole won all three congressional districts.

district	Dole	Clinton	Perot	Representative
1st	49.7%	38.1%	11.3%	Doug Bereuter
2nd	52.5%	38.0%	8.5%	Jon Lynn Christensen
3rd	58.8%	28.7%	11.8%	Bill Barrett

=== Results by county ===
County	Bob Dole Republican		Bill Clinton Democratic		Ross Perot Reform		Harry Browne Libertarian		Howard Phillips Independent		John Hagelin Natural Law		Margin		Total votes cast
County	#	%	#	%	#	%	#	%	#	%	#	%	#	%	Total votes cast
Adams	6,924	55.41%	3,935	31.49%	1,513	12.11%	60	0.48%	53	0.42%	11	0.09%	2,989	23.92%	12,496
Antelope	2,005	59.50%	884	26.23%	457	13.56%	11	0.33%	10	0.30%	3	0.09%	1,121	33.27%	3,370
Arthur	187	72.48%	25	9.69%	46	17.83%	0	0.00%	0	0.00%	0	0.00%	141 (Note: In this county where Perot ran second ahead of Clinton, margin given is Dole vote minus Perot vote and percentage margin Dole percentage minus Perot percentage.)	54.65%	258
Banner	309	76.11%	62	15.27%	30	7.39%	2	0.49%	3	0.74%	0	0.00%	247	60.84%	406
Blaine	284	75.13%	53	14.02%	39	10.32%	1	0.26%	1	0.26%	0	0.00%	231	61.11%	378
Boone	1,695	57.63%	806	27.41%	424	14.42%	7	0.24%	3	0.10%	6	0.20%	889	30.22%	2,941
Box Butte	2,458	49.41%	1,782	35.82%	695	13.97%	18	0.36%	15	0.30%	7	0.14%	676	13.59%	4,975
Boyd	778	57.97%	372	27.72%	181	13.49%	5	0.37%	3	0.22%	3	0.22%	406	30.25%	1,342
Brown	1,105	62.57%	359	20.33%	289	16.36%	4	0.23%	8	0.45%	1	0.06%	746	42.24%	1,766
Buffalo	10,004	63.09%	4,277	26.97%	1,484	9.36%	49	0.31%	16	0.10%	26	0.16%	5,727	36.12%	15,856
Burt	1,707	48.83%	1,237	35.38%	497	14.22%	21	0.60%	31	0.89%	3	0.09%	470	13.45%	3,496
Butler	2,042	55.25%	1,099	29.73%	512	13.85%	19	0.51%	14	0.38%	10	0.27%	943	25.52%	3,696
Cass	4,878	50.37%	3,477	35.90%	1,239	12.79%	41	0.42%	29	0.30%	21	0.22%	1,401	14.47%	9,685
Cedar	2,171	52.20%	1,218	29.29%	739	17.77%	10	0.24%	19	0.46%	2	0.05%	953	22.91%	4,159
Chase	1,277	68.88%	365	19.69%	197	10.63%	9	0.49%	3	0.16%	3	0.16%	912	49.19%	1,854
Cherry	1,905	68.04%	551	19.68%	332	11.86%	2	0.07%	7	0.25%	3	0.11%	1,354	48.36%	2,800
Cheyenne	2,571	64.83%	1,059	26.70%	287	7.24%	31	0.78%	10	0.25%	8	0.20%	1,512	38.13%	3,966
Clay	1,982	59.86%	880	26.58%	425	12.84%	6	0.18%	16	0.48%	2	0.06%	1,102	33.28%	3,311
Colfax	1,954	55.23%	1,065	30.10%	492	13.91%	9	0.25%	14	0.40%	4	0.11%	889	25.13%	3,538
Cuming	2,520	61.60%	1,033	25.25%	503	12.30%	10	0.24%	20	0.49%	5	0.12%	1,487	36.35%	4,091
Custer	3,453	64.15%	1,293	24.02%	615	11.42%	10	0.19%	9	0.17%	3	0.06%	2,160	40.13%	5,383
Dakota	2,592	43.31%	2,632	43.98%	721	12.05%	13	0.22%	21	0.35%	6	0.10%	−40	−0.67%	5,985
Dawes	1,991	55.69%	1,108	30.99%	442	12.36%	20	0.56%	8	0.22%	6	0.17%	883	24.70%	3,575
Dawson	4,794	59.44%	2,180	27.03%	1,044	12.94%	26	0.32%	15	0.19%	6	0.07%	2,614	32.41%	8,065
Deuel	629	63.47%	245	24.72%	111	11.20%	3	0.30%	3	0.30%	0	0.00%	384	38.75%	991
Dixon	1,478	51.95%	931	32.72%	414	14.55%	4	0.14%	15	0.53%	3	0.11%	547	19.23%	2,845
Dodge	7,484	50.95%	5,181	35.27%	1,894	12.89%	44	0.30%	53	0.36%	32	0.22%	2,303	15.68%	14,688
Douglas	92,334	51.38%	70,708	39.34%	14,863	8.27%	803	0.45%	603	0.34%	410	0.23%	21,626	12.04%	179,721
Dundy	752	68.30%	224	20.35%	112	10.17%	4	0.36%	7	0.64%	2	0.18%	528	47.95%	1,101
Fillmore	1,696	54.80%	1,058	34.18%	321	10.37%	9	0.29%	8	0.26%	3	0.10%	638	20.62%	3,095
Franklin	1,013	59.03%	483	28.15%	215	12.53%	2	0.12%	1	0.06%	2	0.12%	530	30.88%	1,716
Frontier	901	64.96%	310	22.35%	169	12.18%	2	0.14%	2	0.14%	3	0.22%	591	42.61%	1,387
Furnas	1,475	61.18%	663	27.50%	207	8.59%	56	2.32%	7	0.29%	3	0.12%	812	33.68%	2,411
Gage	4,413	44.83%	4,008	40.72%	1,346	13.67%	37	0.38%	27	0.27%	12	0.12%	405	4.11%	9,843
Garden	851	65.61%	279	21.51%	155	11.95%	7	0.54%	3	0.23%	2	0.15%	572	44.10%	1,297
Garfield	625	63.26%	249	25.20%	111	11.23%	3	0.30%	0	0.00%	0	0.00%	376	38.06%	988
Gosper	609	58.78%	275	26.54%	150	14.48%	1	0.10%	1	0.10%	0	0.00%	334	32.24%	1,036
Grant	258	64.82%	84	21.11%	55	13.82%	1	0.25%	0	0.00%	0	0.00%	174	43.71%	398
Greeley	642	50.27%	472	36.96%	155	12.14%	4	0.31%	3	0.23%	1	0.08%	170	13.31%	1,277
Hall	10,183	52.45%	6,708	34.55%	2,403	12.38%	78	0.40%	26	0.13%	18	0.09%	3,475	17.90%	19,416
Hamilton	2,623	61.37%	1,172	27.42%	457	10.69%	17	0.40%	3	0.07%	2	0.05%	1,451	33.95%	4,274
Harlan	1,120	60.28%	520	27.99%	203	10.93%	8	0.43%	4	0.22%	3	0.16%	600	32.29%	1,858
Hayes	439	77.02%	87	15.26%	39	6.84%	1	0.18%	2	0.35%	2	0.35%	352	61.76%	570
Hitchcock	977	62.27%	409	26.07%	173	11.03%	2	0.13%	5	0.32%	3	0.19%	568	36.20%	1,569
Holt	3,436	65.27%	1,107	21.03%	677	12.86%	14	0.27%	23	0.44%	7	0.13%	2,329	44.24%	5,264
Hooker	308	59.92%	115	22.37%	83	16.15%	3	0.58%	3	0.58%	2	0.39%	193	37.55%	514
Howard	1,294	50.10%	853	33.02%	417	16.14%	8	0.31%	4	0.15%	7	0.27%	441	17.08%	2,583
Jefferson	1,979	49.17%	1,520	37.76%	495	12.30%	12	0.30%	15	0.37%	4	0.10%	459	11.41%	4,025
Johnson	1,009	47.98%	770	36.61%	309	14.69%	5	0.24%	4	0.19%	6	0.29%	239	11.37%	2,103
Kearney	1,953	64.07%	782	25.66%	296	9.71%	12	0.39%	5	0.16%	0	0.00%	1,171	38.41%	3,048
Keith	2,504	65.50%	830	21.71%	460	12.03%	21	0.55%	5	0.13%	3	0.08%	1,674	43.79%	3,823
Keya Paha	385	72.10%	94	17.60%	47	8.80%	2	0.37%	6	1.12%	0	0.00%	291	54.50%	534
Kimball	1,011	56.67%	527	29.54%	212	11.88%	24	1.35%	8	0.45%	2	0.11%	484	27.13%	1,784
Knox	2,123	53.91%	1,266	32.15%	531	13.48%	3	0.08%	12	0.30%	3	0.08%	857	21.76%	3,938
Lancaster	44,812	45.86%	43,339	44.36%	8,595	8.80%	486	0.50%	210	0.21%	266	0.27%	1,473	1.50%	97,708
Lincoln	7,482	50.54%	5,165	34.89%	2,043	13.80%	71	0.48%	26	0.18%	17	0.11%	2,317	15.65%	14,804
Logan	294	65.63%	79	17.63%	72	16.07%	1	0.22%	2	0.45%	0	0.00%	215	48.00%	448
Loup	229	68.77%	74	22.22%	28	8.41%	2	0.60%	0	0.00%	0	0.00%	155	46.55%	333
Madison	7,965	62.97%	3,047	24.09%	1,554	12.29%	28	0.22%	41	0.32%	14	0.11%	4,918	38.88%	12,649
McPherson	233	72.36%	50	15.53%	33	10.25%	3	0.93%	3	0.93%	0	0.00%	183	56.83%	322
Merrick	2,084	58.67%	997	28.07%	449	12.64%	9	0.25%	8	0.23%	5	0.14%	1,087	30.60%	3,552
Morrill	1,296	58.86%	620	28.16%	262	11.90%	13	0.59%	9	0.41%	2	0.09%	676	30.70%	2,202
Nance	892	51.74%	585	33.93%	238	13.81%	2	0.12%	6	0.35%	1	0.06%	307	17.81%	1,724
Nemaha	1,888	51.94%	1,232	33.89%	485	13.34%	15	0.41%	9	0.25%	6	0.17%	656	18.05%	3,635
Nuckolls	1,383	56.01%	757	30.66%	306	12.39%	14	0.57%	8	0.32%	1	0.04%	626	25.35%	2,469
Otoe	3,290	50.58%	2,279	35.03%	877	13.48%	28	0.43%	27	0.42%	4	0.06%	1,011	15.55%	6,505
Pawnee	766	48.82%	580	36.97%	207	13.19%	8	0.51%	6	0.38%	2	0.13%	186	11.85%	1,569
Perkins	1,018	66.06%	352	22.84%	163	10.58%	6	0.39%	1	0.06%	1	0.06%	666	43.22%	1,541
Phelps	3,015	65.86%	1,071	23.39%	465	10.16%	14	0.31%	9	0.20%	4	0.09%	1,944	42.47%	4,578
Pierce	1,923	62.39%	697	22.62%	446	14.47%	8	0.26%	5	0.16%	3	0.10%	1,226	39.77%	3,082
Platte	7,948	64.11%	3,010	24.28%	1,353	10.91%	39	0.31%	39	0.31%	9	0.07%	4,938	39.83%	12,398
Polk	1,504	58.84%	750	29.34%	268	10.49%	20	0.78%	4	0.16%	10	0.39%	754	29.50%	2,556
Red Willow	3,112	62.10%	1,365	27.24%	499	9.96%	25	0.50%	3	0.06%	7	0.14%	1,747	34.86%	5,011
Richardson	2,089	48.85%	1,517	35.48%	633	14.80%	26	0.61%	7	0.16%	4	0.09%	572	13.37%	4,276
Rock	564	63.73%	180	20.34%	135	15.25%	4	0.45%	2	0.23%	0	0.00%	384	43.39%	885
Saline	1,945	37.58%	2,523	48.75%	689	13.31%	12	0.23%	3	0.06%	3	0.06%	−578	−11.17%	5,175
Sarpy	23,023	57.74%	12,806	32.11%	3,722	9.33%	157	0.39%	109	0.27%	60	0.15%	10,217	25.63%	39,877
Saunders	4,514	52.51%	2,777	32.30%	1,223	14.23%	36	0.42%	30	0.35%	17	0.20%	1,737	20.21%	8,597
Scotts Bluff	7,641	56.43%	4,547	33.58%	1,251	9.24%	55	0.41%	35	0.26%	12	0.09%	3,094	22.85%	13,541
Seward	3,479	51.86%	2,432	36.25%	745	11.10%	24	0.36%	23	0.34%	6	0.09%	1,047	15.61%	6,709
Sheridan	1,834	67.50%	573	21.09%	289	10.64%	14	0.52%	3	0.11%	4	0.15%	1,261	46.41%	2,717
Sherman	822	49.16%	567	33.91%	266	15.91%	6	0.36%	6	0.36%	5	0.30%	255	15.25%	1,672
Sioux	551	71.74%	138	17.97%	75	9.77%	1	0.13%	3	0.39%	0	0.00%	413	53.77%	768
Stanton	1,457	59.64%	577	23.62%	386	15.80%	9	0.37%	10	0.41%	4	0.16%	880	36.02%	2,443
Thayer	1,698	56.81%	933	31.21%	334	11.17%	12	0.40%	7	0.23%	5	0.17%	765	25.60%	2,989
Thomas	303	70.63%	64	14.92%	62	14.45%	0	0.00%	0	0.00%	0	0.00%	239	55.71%	429
Thurston	835	39.50%	962	45.51%	293	13.86%	11	0.52%	10	0.47%	3	0.14%	−127	−6.01%	2,114
Valley	1,346	56.27%	758	31.69%	274	11.45%	4	0.17%	6	0.25%	4	0.17%	588	24.58%	2,392
Washington	4,391	57.03%	2,248	29.19%	971	12.61%	34	0.44%	44	0.57%	12	0.16%	2,143	27.84%	7,700
Wayne	2,150	58.49%	1,048	28.51%	440	11.97%	11	0.30%	22	0.60%	5	0.14%	1,102	29.98%	3,676
Webster	1,094	55.96%	621	31.76%	236	12.07%	1	0.05%	1	0.05%	2	0.10%	473	24.20%	1,955
Wheeler	241	57.66%	106	25.36%	69	16.51%	1	0.24%	1	0.24%	0	0.00%	135	32.30%	418
York	4,266	65.56%	1,653	25.40%	559	8.59%	18	0.28%	8	0.12%	3	0.05%	2,613	40.16%	6,507
Totals	363,467	53.65%	236,761	34.95%	71,278	10.52%	2,792	0.41%	1,928	0.28%	1,189	0.18%	126,706	18.70%	677,415

==== Counties that flipped from Republican to Democratic ====
- Dakota
- Thurston

== See also ==
- United States presidential elections in Nebraska
- Presidency of Bill Clinton
