= LeRoy Pfister =

American politician (1925–2002)

Member of the Nebraska Legislature from the 17th district
- In office December 31, 1971 – January 2, 1973
- Preceded by: Elmer Wallwey
- Succeeded by: John Murphy

Personal details
- Born: January 2, 1925 Newcastle, Nebraska
- Died: January 16, 2002 (aged 77) Naples, Florida
- Party: Democratic
- Spouse: Gloria Hangman (m. 1948)
- Children: 5 (Angela, David, Rebecca, Pamela, Mary)
- Occupation: Barber

Military service
- Allegiance: United States
- Branch/service: United States Army

LeRoy G. Pfister (January 2, 1925 – January 16, 2002) was a Democratic politician from Nebraska who served as a member of the Nebraska Legislature from 1971 to 1973.

== Early life ==
Pfister was born in Newcastle, Nebraska, and graduated from Newcastle High School. He served in the U.S. Army during World War II, and attended a barbering school in Des Moines, Iowa. Pfister worked as a barber in South Sioux City.

== Nebraska Legislature ==
In 1971, State Senator Elmer Wallwey resigned from the legislature, effective December 31, to become the regional director of the Office of Mental Retardation for northeastern Nebraska. Governor J. James Exon appointed Pfister to serve out the remaining year of Wallwey's term. He was sworn in on December 31, 1971.

Pfister ran for a full term in 1972, and was challenged by real estate developer Chris Miller, businessman John Murphy, and housewife Elaine Schmadeke. Pfister narrowly placed second in the primary, receiving 29 percent of the vote to Murphy's 30 percent, Schmadeke's 21 percent, and Miller's 20 percent. Murphy and Pfister advanced to the general election, which Murphy narrowly won, receiving 53 percent of the vote to Pfister's 47 percent.

== Death ==
Pfister died on January 16, 2002.
