= Kurt Hohenstein =

American politician

Member of the Nebraska Legislature from the 17th district
- In office January 6, 1993 – August 10, 1993
- Preceded by: Gerald Conway
- Succeeded by: L. Patrick Engel

Personal details
- Born: July 12, 1955 (age 71) Lincoln, Nebraska
- Party: Republican
- Education: University of Nebraska–Lincoln (B.A., J.D.); University of Virginia (Ph.D.)
- Occupation: History professor, attorney (disbarred)

Kurt Hohenstein (born July 12, 1955) is a Republican politician, disbarred attorney, and history professor who served as a member of the Nebraska Legislature from the 17th district from January to August 1993.

== Early career ==
Hohenstein was born in Lincoln, Nebraska, in 1955. He graduated from the Homer Community School in 1973, and then attended the University of Nebraska–Lincoln, receiving his bachelor's degree in 1976 and his Juris Doctor in 1980. Hohenstein served on the Middle Missouri Natural Resources District from 1980 to 1986, and served as the part-time Dakota County Attorney.

== Nebraska Legislature ==
In 1992, Hohenstein announced that he would challenge incumbent State Senator Gerald Conway for re-election in the 17th district, which was based in northeastern Nebraska. In the primary election, Hohenstein placed ahead of Conway, winning 56 percent of the vote to Conway's 44 percent.

Following the primary election, the Supreme Court of Nebraska struck down the state's legislative districts, and the legislature subsequently redrew the districts. Hohenstein attacked Conway, the chairman of the redistricting committee, for "gerrymandering" the 17th district for his own electoral benefit. Hohenstein ultimately defeated Conway by a wide margin, receiving 61 percent of the vote to Conway's 39 percent.

== Legal troubles ==
Shortly after Hohenstein took office, the Nebraska State Bar Association received a complaint against Hohenstein from his former law partner, which alleged that he had stolen money from one of his clients. The Bar initiated an investigation, which resulted in Hohenstein voluntarily surrendering his law license and the appointment of a special prosecutor. The Supreme Court subsequently disbarred him. Though Hohenstein originally said that he would not resign from the legislature, he ultimately did so on August 10, 1993, in anticipation of being charged with a felony. Later that day, special prosecutor Clarence Mock filed a felony theft charge against Hohenstein for stealing $30,298 from a former client, some of which he used to install a hot tub and spa at his personal home. Mock alleged that Hohenstein had two faces: "There was one whose public face was of a law-and-order and hang'-em-high prosecutor," and the other was "the real Kurt Hohenstein, one who was engaged in a pattern of theft without any remorse[.]"

Hohenstein pleaded guilty to the felony charge as part of a plea agreement with prosecutors in which he resigned from the legislature in exchange for not facing additional charges for other theft allegations. He was sentenced to a prison term between six years and eight months to twenty years at the Nebraska State Penitentiary, He was transferred to a minimum-security prison in 1994, and began working for the Gallup Organization doing telephone interviews as part of a work-release program. In 1998, the Parole Board voted 3–1 to grant Hohenstein parole, and he was released from prison.

== Subsequent career ==
Following Hohenstein's release from prison, he attended the University of Virginia, receiving his Doctor of Philosophy in history. He received the Hughes-Gossett Award from the Supreme Court Historical Society for a 2002 article that he authored, Just What the Doctor Ordered: the Harrison Anti-Narcotic Act, the Supreme Court, and the Federal Regulation of Medical Practice, 1915-1919. He joined the faculty of Winona State University in 2005 as an assistant professor of history.
