= Nels Bostrom =

American politician (1867–1949)

Member of the Nebraska House of Representatives from the 25th district
- In office January 3, 1933 – January 1, 1935
- Preceded by: L. C. Nuernberger
- Succeeded by: L. C. Nuernberger

Personal details
- Born: December 8, 1867 Sweden
- Died: December 22, 1949 (aged 82)
- Party: Democratic
- Spouse(s): Anna Johnson (m. 1888; died 1933) Mayme Shear (m. 1936)
- Children: 4
- Occupation: Farmer, stock grower

Nels J. Bostrom (December 8, 1867 — December 22, 1949) was a Democratic politician from Nebraska who served as a member of the Nebraska House of Representatives from the 25th district from 1933 to 1935.

== Early life ==
Bostrom was born in Sweden in 1867, and immigrated to the United States as a child, settling in Nebraska in 1884. He worked as a farmer and stock grower in Concord.

== Nebraska House of Representatives ==
In 1932, Bostrom ran for the Nebraska House of Representatives from the 25th district, challenging Republican State Representative L. C. Nuernberger. Bostrom narrowly defeated Nuernberger, winning 52 percent of the vote to his 48 percent. Nuernberger ran against Bostrom in 1934, and defeated him with 58 percent of the vote.

== Personal life ==
He married Anna Johnson in 1888. Bostrom was widowed in 1933 when his wife, Anna, died, and he remarried in 1936. He died on December 22, 1949.
