= Nebraska State College System =

State college system in Nebraska, United States

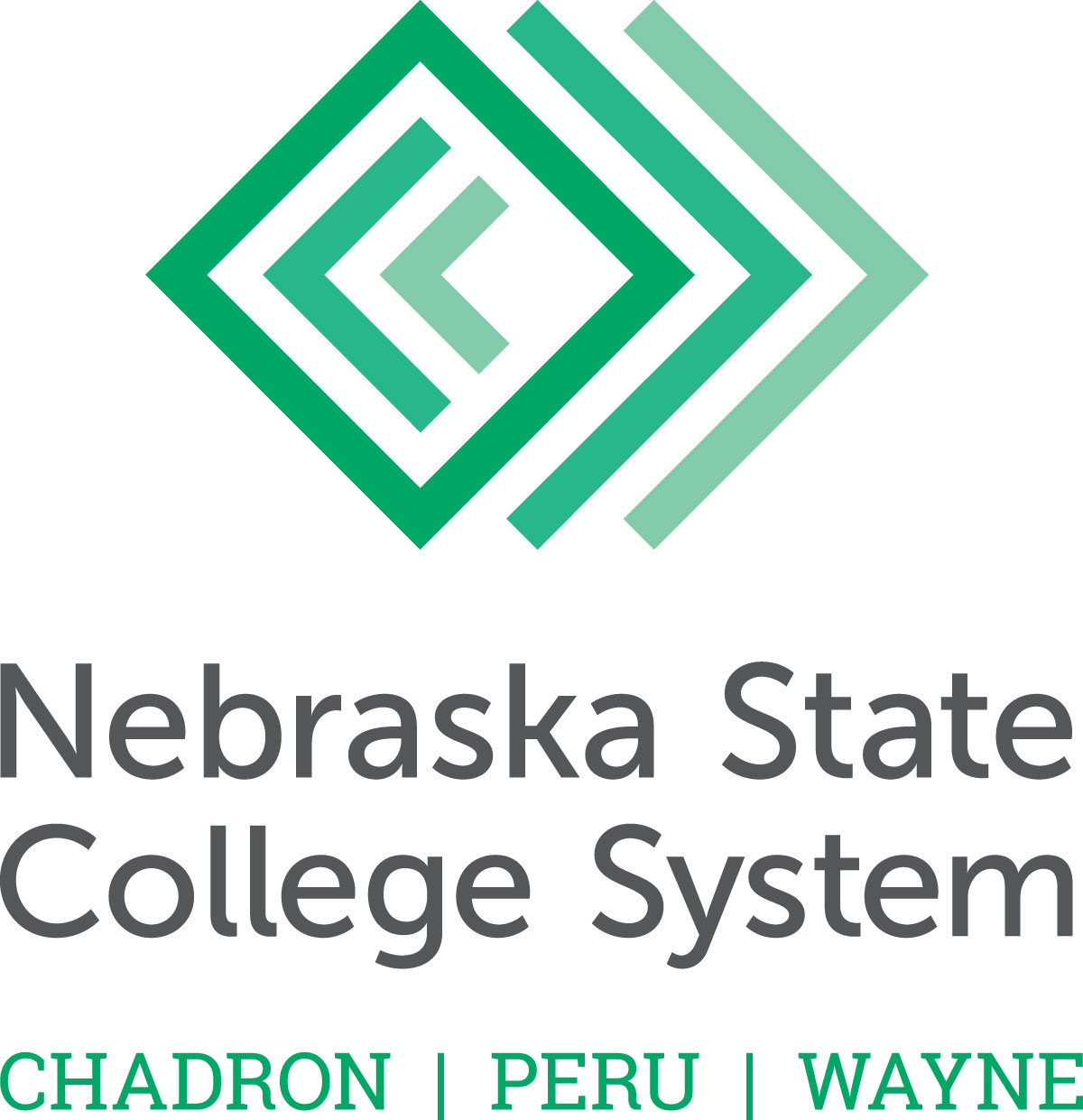
- Type: State university system
- Established: 1867
- Chancellor: Dr. Paul Turman
- Location: 1233 Lincoln Mall, Lincoln, Nebraska, U.S.
- Website: nscs.edu

The Nebraska State College System is the governing body for Nebraska's three public colleges (Chadron, Peru, and Wayne) that are not part of the University of Nebraska System. It is headquartered in Lincoln, Nebraska. Chadron, Peru, and Wayne, along with the System Office and the Board of Trustees constitute the Nebraska State College System.

== History ==
The Nebraska State College System was originally formed in 1867 as the Nebraska State Normal School with the founding of Peru State Normal School in Peru, Nebraska. The system was formed by the Nebraska State Legislature following Nebraska's admission to the Union. Kearney State Normal School was formed in 1905 as a part of the normal school system. In 1910, the Nebraska Normal College was transferred into the system and was re-branded to the Wayne State Normal School. Chadron State Normal School was added to the system in 1911.

In 1921, the Nebraska State Legislature passed a law making all state-funded normal schools colleges. In 1963, the legislature passed another law requiring all colleges to re-brand to state colleges. Additionally, the system re-branded to the Nebraska State College System. In 1990, Kearney State College left the Nebraska State College System and joined the University of Nebraska system, re-branding to the University of Nebraska at Kearney.

== Colleges ==
Nebraska State College System Locations.

Name	Location (Note: All locations are within the State of Nebraska.)	Founded	Enrollment	Athletics nickname	Athletics conference	Athletics level
Chadron State College	Chadron	1911	2,260	Eagles	Rocky Mountain (RMAC) (Note: Currently an NCAA Division II athletic conference.)	NCAA Division II
Peru State College	Peru	1865	1,415	Bobcats	Heart of America (HAAC) (Note: Currently an NAIA athletic conference.)	NAIA
Wayne State College	Wayne	1910	4,202	Wildcats	Northern Sun (NSIC)	NCAA Division II

== Board of trustees ==
- Bob Engles - Chair
- Marjean Terrell - Vice Chair
- Carter "Cap" Peterson
- Connie Edmond
- Jess Zeiss
- Brian Maher
- Danny Reynaga
- Samantha Hill, Chadron State Student Trustee
- Austen Janssen, Peru State Student Trustee
- Robynne McMaster, Wayne State Student Trustee

As of 2025-11-14

== See also ==
- University of Nebraska system
- Education in Nebraska
