= Wayne State College =

Public college in Wayne, Nebraska, US

Coordinates: 42°14′28″N 97°00′54″W

- Former name: List: Nebraska Normal College (1891–1909); Wayne State Normal College (1910–1921); Wayne State Normal College and Teachers College (1921–1949); Wayne State Teachers College (1949–1963)
- Type: Public college
- Established: 1910; 116 years ago
- Affiliations: Nebraska State College System
- President: Marysz Rames
- Students: 4,623
- Location: Wayne, Nebraska, U.S.
- Campus: Rural, 128 acres (52 ha)
- Colors: Black and gold
- Nickname: Wildcats
- Sporting affiliations: NCAA Division II – NSIC
- Website: wsc.edu
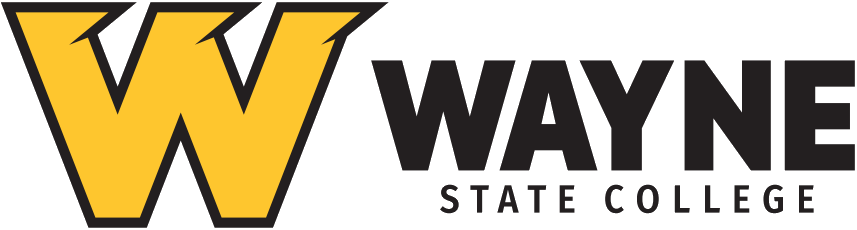

Wayne State College (WSC) is a public college in Wayne, Nebraska, United States. It is part of the Nebraska State College System and enrolls 4,623 students. Their mascot is the Wildcat. The college was preceded by the Nebraska Normal College, which was formed in 1891 by J.M. Pile. Control of the college was later transferred to the state, and it was officially formed in 1910 as the Wayne State Normal College. The college changed its name to Wayne State College in 1963.

== History ==
Wayne State College was preceded by the Nebraska Normal College, which opened on November 21, 1891. The college was formed by J.M. Pile, who then served as the college's president. It was a private college, then-owned by faculty. Pile died in 1909, and control of the college was transferred to his son, Fred M. Pile. Pile transferred control of the college to the Nebraska State College System, making it a state institution the following year, re-branding to the Wayne State Normal College.

The college added the Wayne Teachers College in 1921. Additionally, the entire organization re-branded to the Wayne State Normal College and Teachers College. In 1933, during the Great Depression in the United States, Wayne State had laid-off half of its staff due to a funding crisis. In 1949, the Nebraska State Legislature changed the name of the college to the Wayne State Teacher's College after the name had been used unofficially years prior. In 1963, the state legislature changed the name again to its current name, Wayne State College.

In 1999 the Nebraska Unicameral Legislature introduced bill LB631, aimed at merging Chadron State College and Wayne State College into the University of Nebraska system, while turning Peru State College into a community college. A competing bill, LB650, was introduced about the same time but with the intent of funding Peru State College $7 million for renovations. However, these plans would be abandoned soon after. In 2011, Wayne State College and Northeast Community College opened the College Center in South Sioux City. College Center provides affordable college-level education to older adults.

== Campus ==
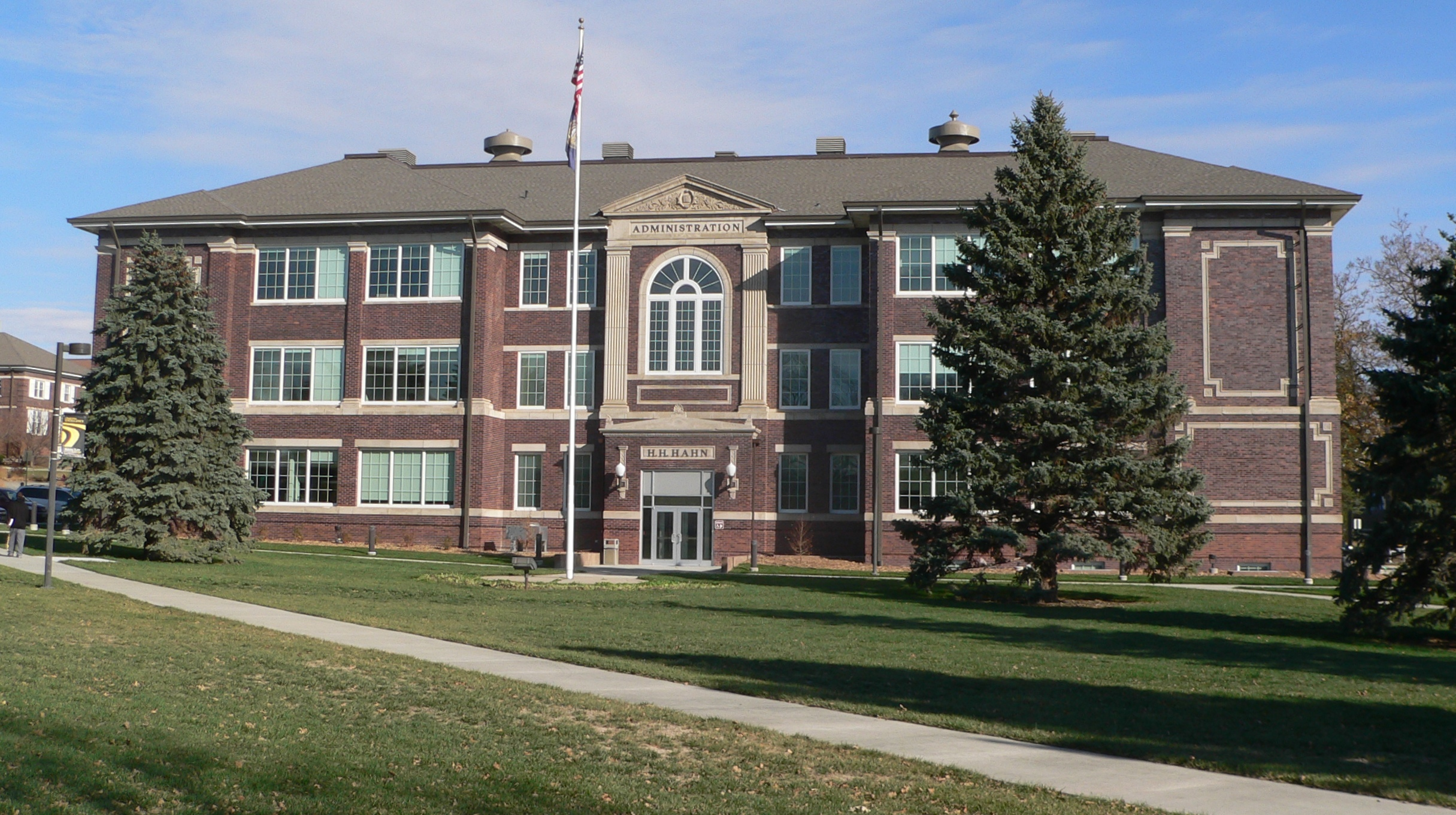
Hahn Administration Building on Wayne State campus

Wayne State College's campus is located in Wayne, Nebraska, United States. The campus contains seven residence halls, ten academic buildings, thirteen athletic facilities, and seven service facilities. The campus also includes the Willow Bowl. Also located on the main campus is the college radio station, KWSC. Wayne State College also operates a satellite campus at College Center in South Sioux City.

== Academics ==
Undergraduate demographics as of fall 2023
Race and ethnicity	Total
White	78%
Hispanic	10%
International student	5%
Two or more races	3%
Black	3%
American Indian/Alaska Native	1%
Asian	1%
Economic diversity
Low-income (Note: The percentage of students who received an income-based federal Pell grant intended for low-income students.)	34%
Affluent (Note: The percentage of students who are a part of the American middle class at the bare minimum.)	66%

Academic rankings

Regional
- U.S. News & World Report: 96 of 165

Wayne State College is a public college operated under the Nebraska State College System. The college has 31 undergraduate fields of study. Major fields of study include Business Administration, Teachers Education and Professional Development, Criminal Justice and Corrections, and Health and Physical Education. As of 2025, the college enrolls 3,041 undergraduate students.

For 2024, U.S. News & World Report ranked Wayne State tied for No.96 out of 165 Regional Universities Midwest, No.32 in Regional Universities Midwest Top Public Schools, and tied for No.92 in Regional Universities Midwest Top Performers on Social Mobility. Wayne State has an open admission policy, admitting all applicants so long as certain minimum requirements are met. In 2024, those enrolled had an average 3.36 high school GPA.

== Athletics ==
Wayne State athletic teams are the Wildcats. The college is a member of the Division II level of the National Collegiate Athletic Association (NCAA), primarily competing in the Northern Sun Intercollegiate Conference (NSIC) in all sports since the 1999–2000 academic year. The Wildcats previously competed in the Central States Intercollegiate Conference (CSIC) of the National Association of Intercollegiate Athletics (NAIA) from 1976–77 to 1988–89; as well as in the Rocky Mountain Athletic Conference (RMAC) as a provisional member during the 1989–90 school year.

== Notable alumni ==
- Greg L. Adams, state senator and speaker of the Nebraska Legislature
- Thomas M. Carsey, professor of Political Science
- Byron Chamberlain, football player
- Lamart Cooper, football player
- Charlie Janssen, state senator in the Nebraska Legislature
- James Keogh, journalist and political adviser, assistant managing editor of Time, special assistant to President Richard Nixon, director of U.S. Information Agency
- Connie Kunzmann, basketball player
- John H. Kyl, member of the U.S. House of Representatives, assistant secretary of Dept. of the Interior 1973–1977
- Gale McGee, Democratic U.S. senator from Wyoming 1959–1977, U.S. ambassador to the Organization of American States
- Ruben Mendoza, football player
- Hilda Neihardt, historian
- John Neihardt, Poet Laureate of Nebraska, author of Black Elk Speaks
- Brad Ottis, football player
- Val Peterson, governor of Nebraska 1947–1953, director of Federal Civil Defense Administration, U.S. ambassador to Denmark and Finland
- Rosie Ruiz, fraudster
- Brett Salisbury, football player and author of The Transform Diet
- Tom Sherlock, British Basketball League forward
- Kevin Swayne, football player
- David Townsend, art director for MGM
- Brian Wansink, Cornell University professor and author of Mindless Eating: Why We Eat More Than We Think
- Norma Wendelburg, composer
- DaVarryl Williamson, boxer
- Paul Sather, college basketball coach

== See also ==
- Wayne State College Arboretum
