= Wayne, Nebraska =

City in Wayne County, Nebraska, United States

- City
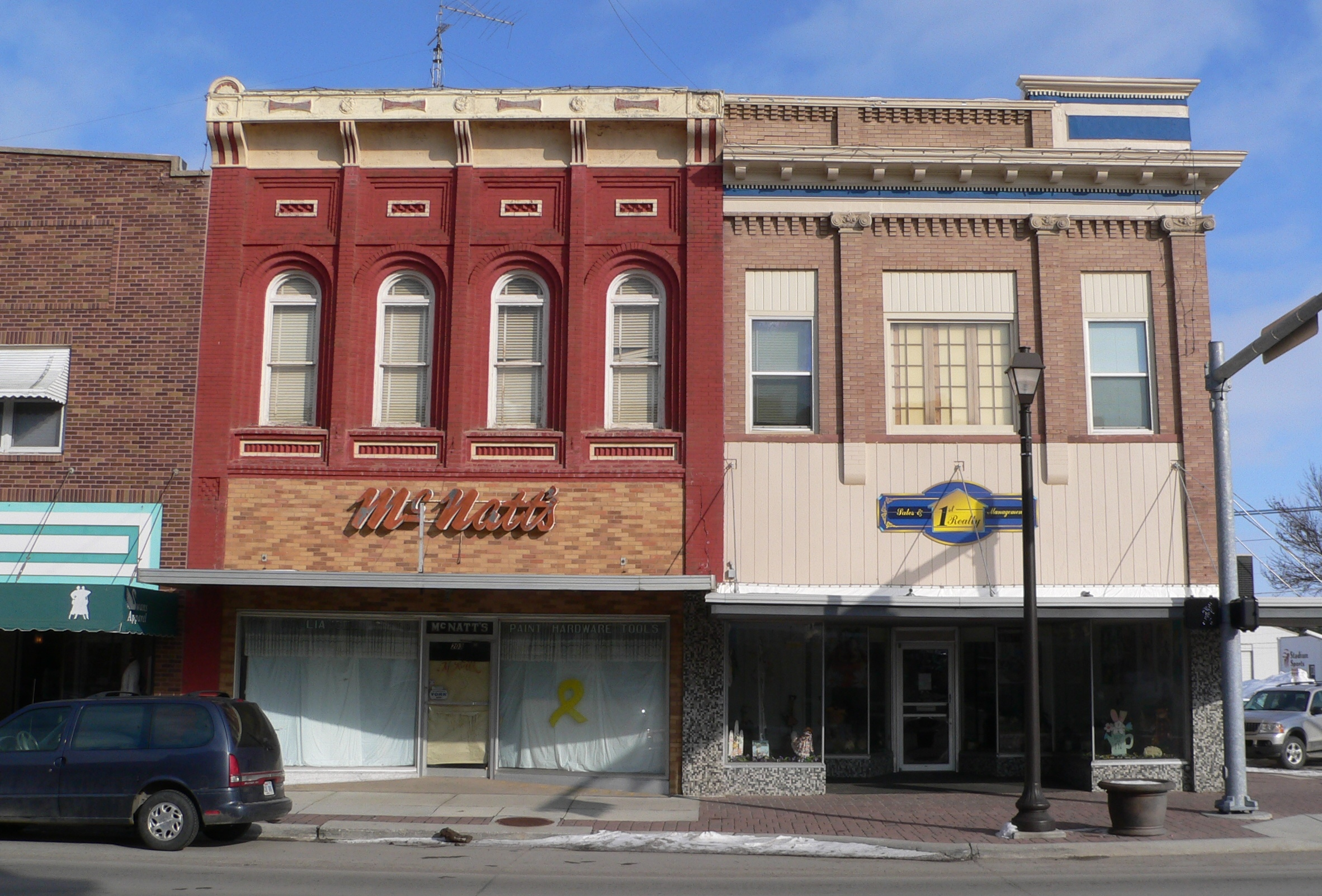
- Wayne's commercial district is listed in the National Register of Historic Places.

- Location of Wayne, Nebraska
- Coordinates: 42°14′17″N 97°00′36″W
- Country: United States
- State: Nebraska
- County: Wayne
- Founded: 1881
- Named for: Anthony Wayne

Government
  - Type: Mayor/Council

Area
  - Total: 2.87 sq mi (7.43 km^{2})
  - Land: 2.83 sq mi (7.32 km^{2})
  - Water: 0.042 sq mi (0.11 km^{2})
- Elevation: 1,467 ft (447 m)

Population (2020)
  - Total: 5,973
  - Density: 2,114.8/sq mi (816.51/km^{2})
- Time zone: UTC-6 (Central (CST))
  - Summer (DST): UTC-5 (CDT)
- ZIP code: 68787
- Area code: 402
- FIPS code: 31-51840
- GNIS feature ID: 2397233
- Website: www.cityofwayne.org

Wayne - colloquially called “Wayne, America” - is a city in Wayne County, Nebraska, United States. As of the 2020 census, Wayne had a population of 5,973. It is the county seat of Wayne County and the home of Wayne State College.

== History ==
Wayne was founded in 1881 when the Chicago, St. Paul, Minneapolis and Omaha Railway was extended to that point. It was named for and with Wayne County.

== Geography ==
According to the United States Census Bureau, the city has a total area of 2.25 square miles (5.83 km^{2}), of which 2.21 square miles (5.72 km^{2}) is land and 0.04 square miles (0.10 km^{2}) is water.

== Demographics ==
Historical population
Census	Pop.	Note	%±
1890	1,178		—
1900	2,119		79.9%
1910	2,140		1.0%
1920	2,115		−1.2%
1930	2,381		12.6%
1940	2,719		14.2%
1950	3,595		32.2%
1960	4,217		17.3%
1970	5,379		27.6%
1980	5,240		−2.6%
1990	5,142		−1.9%
2000	5,583		8.6%
2010	5,660		1.4%
2020	5,973		5.5%
U.S. Decennial Census; 2012 Estimate

=== 2020 census ===
As of the 2020 census, Wayne had a population of 5,973 and 978 families. The median age was 23.1 years. 17.7% of residents were under the age of 18 and 12.6% were 65 years of age or older. For every 100 females, there were 98.1 males, and for every 100 females age 18 and over, there were 97.1 males.

100.0% of residents lived in urban areas, while 0.0% lived in rural areas.

There were 2,063 households in Wayne, of which 24.9% had children under the age of 18 living in them. Of all households, 39.3% were married-couple households, 24.4% were households with a male householder and no spouse or partner present, and 29.3% were households with a female householder and no spouse or partner present. About 35.8% of all households were made up of individuals, and 13.2% had someone living alone who was 65 years of age or older. The average household size was 2.0 and the average family size was 2.8.

There were 2,325 housing units, of which 11.3% were vacant. The homeowner vacancy rate was 1.4% and the rental vacancy rate was 13.5%.

Racial composition as of the 2020 census
Race	Number	Percent
White	4,599	77.0%
Black or African American	341	5.7%
American Indian and Alaska Native	46	0.8%
Asian	117	2.0%
Native Hawaiian and Other Pacific Islander	8	0.1%
Some other race	515	8.6%
Two or more races	347	5.8%
Hispanic or Latino (of any race)	767	12.8%

=== Income and poverty ===
The 2016–2020 5-year American Community Survey estimates show that the median household income was $47,054 (with a margin of error of +/- $13,778) and the median family income $73,220 (+/- $4,710). Males had a median income of $14,754 (+/- $8,702) versus $9,385 (+/- $3,841) for females. The median income for those above 16 years old was $12,150 (+/- $3,152). Approximately, 7.5% of families and 18.6% of the population were below the poverty line, including 5.9% of those under the age of 18 and 19.3% of those ages 65 or over.

=== 2010 census ===
At the 2010 census there were 5,660 people, 1,953 households, and 987 families living in the city. The population density was 2,561.1 inhabitants per square mile (988.8/km^{2}). There were 2,082 housing units at an average density of 942.1 per square mile (363.7/km^{2}). The racial makeup of the city was 93.2% White, 2.1% African American, 0.5% Native American, 0.7% Asian, 0.2% Pacific Islander, 2.0% from other races, and 1.4% from two or more races. Hispanic or Latino of any race were 4.8%.

Of the 1,953 households 23.3% had children under the age of 18 living with them, 41.4% were married couples living together, 6.7% had a female householder with no husband present, 2.5% had a male householder with no wife present, and 49.5% were non-families. 33.6% of households were one person and 12.8% were one person aged 65 or older. The average household size was 2.25 and the average family size was 2.90.

The median age was 22.9 years. 15.5% of residents were under the age of 18; 39.8% were between the ages of 18 and 24; 16.7% were from 25 to 44; 15.6% were from 45 to 64; and 12.4% were 65 or older. The gender makeup of the city was 49.2% male and 50.8% female.

=== 2000 census ===
At the 2000 census, there were 5,583 people, 1,850 households, and 989 families living in the city. The population density was 2,550.9 inhabitants per square mile (984.9/km^{2}). There were 1,963 housing units at an average density of 896.9 per square mile (346.3/km^{2}). The racial makeup of the city was 96.35% White, 1.59% African American, 0.36% Native American, 0.34% Asian, 0.02% Pacific Islander, 0.43% from other races, and 0.91% from two or more races. Hispanic or Latino of any race were 1.42% of the population.

Of the 1,850 households 24.6% had children under the age of 18 living with them, 45.3% were married couples living together, 6.4% had a female householder with no husband present, and 46.5% were non-families. 28.6% of households were one person and 11.6% were one person aged 65 or older. The average household size was 2.36 and the average family size was 2.90.

The age distribution was 15.7% under the age of 18, 39.6% from 18 to 24, 17.4% from 25 to 44, 13.9% from 45 to 64, and 13.4% 65 or older. The median age was 23 years. For every 100 females, there were 85.6 males. For every 100 females age 18 and over, there were 85.7 males.

The median household income was $27,730, and the median family income was $51,033. Males had a median income of $30,560 versus $20,847 for females. The per capita income for the city was $13,984. About 7.5% of families and 20.0% of the population were below the poverty line, including 6.9% of those under age 18 and 7.4% of those age 65 or over.

== Climate ==
According to the Köppen Climate Classification system, Wayne has a hot-summer humid continental climate, abbreviated "Dfa" on climate maps. The hottest temperature recorded in Wayne was 105 °F (40.6 °C) on July 13, 1995, and July 20, 2006, while the coldest temperature recorded was −27 °F (−32.8 °C) on January 2, 2018.

Climate data for Wayne, Nebraska, 1991–2020 normals, extremes 1989–present
Month	Jan	Feb	Mar	Apr	May	Jun	Jul	Aug	Sep	Oct	Nov	Dec	Year
Record high °F (°C)	74 (23)	74 (23)	90 (32)	92 (33)	100 (38)	103 (39)	105 (41)	103 (39)	101 (38)	92 (33)	83 (28)	69 (21)	105 (41)
Mean maximum °F (°C)	54.6 (12.6)	59.7 (15.4)	73.8 (23.2)	83.0 (28.3)	89.4 (31.9)	94.8 (34.9)	95.8 (35.4)	94.3 (34.6)	90.7 (32.6)	83.3 (28.5)	71.2 (21.8)	56.2 (13.4)	97.5 (36.4)
Mean daily maximum °F (°C)	30.2 (−1.0)	35.0 (1.7)	47.4 (8.6)	60.1 (15.6)	71.0 (21.7)	81.2 (27.3)	85.1 (29.5)	82.8 (28.2)	75.9 (24.4)	62.5 (16.9)	47.0 (8.3)	34.1 (1.2)	59.4 (15.2)
Daily mean °F (°C)	20.5 (−6.4)	24.8 (−4.0)	35.9 (2.2)	47.7 (8.7)	59.4 (15.2)	70.1 (21.2)	74.2 (23.4)	71.8 (22.1)	63.7 (17.6)	50.4 (10.2)	36.2 (2.3)	24.7 (−4.1)	48.3 (9.0)
Mean daily minimum °F (°C)	10.8 (−11.8)	14.5 (−9.7)	24.4 (−4.2)	35.3 (1.8)	47.8 (8.8)	59.0 (15.0)	63.4 (17.4)	60.8 (16.0)	51.4 (10.8)	38.3 (3.5)	25.3 (−3.7)	15.3 (−9.3)	37.2 (2.9)
Mean minimum °F (°C)	−11.3 (−24.1)	−6.4 (−21.3)	3.6 (−15.8)	19.5 (−6.9)	33.4 (0.8)	46.1 (7.8)	51.7 (10.9)	49.2 (9.6)	35.6 (2.0)	21.1 (−6.1)	6.7 (−14.1)	−5.9 (−21.1)	−15.1 (−26.2)
Record low °F (°C)	−27 (−33)	−25 (−32)	−15 (−26)	6 (−14)	26 (−3)	39 (4)	45 (7)	42 (6)	27 (−3)	9 (−13)	−12 (−24)	−26 (−32)	−27 (−33)
Average precipitation inches (mm)	0.55 (14)	0.75 (19)	1.42 (36)	2.99 (76)	4.20 (107)	4.40 (112)	2.69 (68)	3.57 (91)	2.58 (66)	2.28 (58)	1.21 (31)	0.83 (21)	27.47 (699)
Average snowfall inches (cm)	6.8 (17)	6.7 (17)	5.8 (15)	2.7 (6.9)	0.0 (0.0)	0.0 (0.0)	0.0 (0.0)	0.0 (0.0)	0.0 (0.0)	0.5 (1.3)	3.5 (8.9)	6.2 (16)	32.2 (82.1)
Average extreme snow depth inches (cm)	6.9 (18)	7.2 (18)	5.0 (13)	2.0 (5.1)	0.0 (0.0)	0.0 (0.0)	0.0 (0.0)	0.0 (0.0)	0.0 (0.0)	0.2 (0.51)	2.5 (6.4)	4.6 (12)	10.3 (26)
Average precipitation days (≥ 0.01 in)	4.1	4.4	5.5	8.1	10.2	9.0	6.9	7.4	6.0	5.7	4.1	4.3	75.7
Average snowy days (≥ 0.1 in)	3.8	3.5	2.2	0.8	0.0	0.0	0.0	0.0	0.0	0.4	1.6	3.6	15.9
Source 1: NOAA
Source 2: National Weather Service

== Education ==
Wayne Community Schools operates public schools.

Wayne State College

St. Mary's Catholic Private School

== Notable people ==
- James B. Davis, U.S. Air Force general
- Emily Kinney, musician and television actress (The Walking Dead)
- Don Meyer, college basketball coach

== See also ==
- List of municipalities in Nebraska
