= South Sioux City, Nebraska =

City in Dakota County, Nebraska, United States

South Sioux City
- City
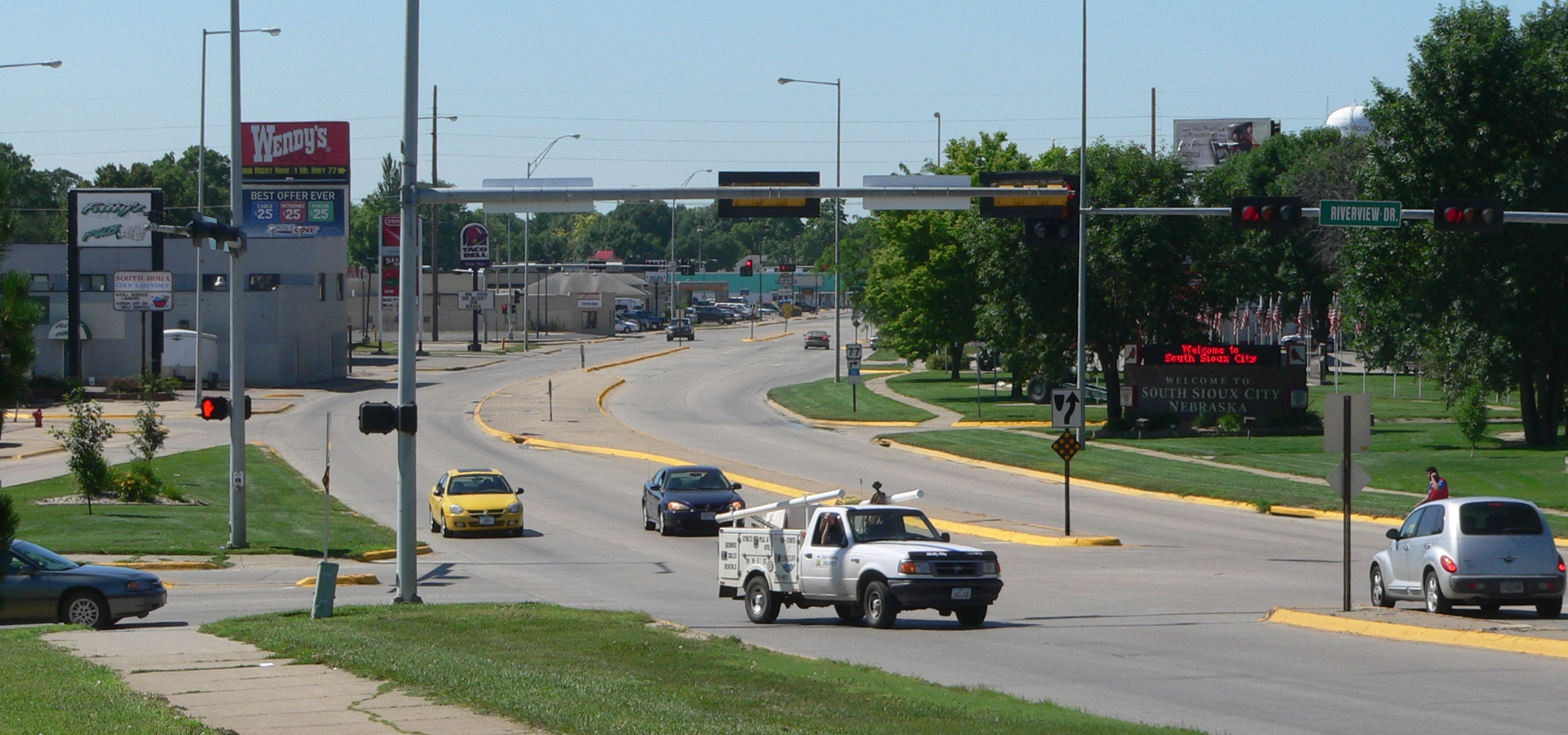
- Heading south on Dakota Avenue approaching Riverview Drive, July 2010

- Location of South Sioux City within Nebraska and Dakota County
- Coordinates: 42°27′46″N 96°24′45″W
- Country: United States
- State: Nebraska
- County: Dakota
- Incorporated: 1887

Government
  - Mayor: Rod Koch

Area
  - Total: 6.63 sq mi (17.16 km^{2})
  - Land: 6.30 sq mi (16.32 km^{2})
  - Water: 0.33 sq mi (0.85 km^{2})
- Elevation: 1,099 ft (335 m)

Population (2020)
  - Total: 14,043
  - Density: 2,229.3/sq mi (860.74/km^{2})
- Time zone: UTC−6 (Central (CST))
  - Summer (DST): UTC−5 (CDT)
- ZIP code: 68776
- Area code: 402
- FIPS code: 31-46030
- GNIS feature ID: 2395919
- Website: southsiouxcity.org

South Sioux City is a city in Dakota County, Nebraska, United States. It is located immediately across the Missouri River from Sioux City, Iowa, and is part of the Sioux City metropolitan area. As of the 2020 census, the city population was 14,043, making it the 14th most populous city in Nebraska.

== History ==
Meriwether Lewis and William Clark passed through the South Sioux City area in 1804.

European settlement on the Nebraska side of the river began as early as 1854. Several town sites were platted and incorporated in the 1850s. Pacific City, incorporated in 1858, was a short-lived settlement. Covington and South Covington, both incorporated in 1857, merged in 1870. Another town, Stanton, was founded in 1856.

South Sioux City was incorporated in 1887. A special election in 1893 approved the merger of Covington and Stanton into the city of South Sioux City.

== Geography ==
According to the United States Census Bureau, the city has a total area of 5.96 square miles (15.44 km^{2}), of which 5.71 square miles (14.79 km^{2}) is land and 0.25 square miles (0.65 km^{2}) is water.

In contrast to its hilly larger neighbor, South Sioux City is relatively flat. The difference in elevation across most of the city is less than 20 feet, generally ranging between 1,085 and 1,105 feet above sea level.

== Demographics ==
Historical population
Census	Pop.	Note	%±
1890	603		—
1900	889		47.4%
1910	1,196		34.5%
1920	2,402		100.8%
1930	3,927		63.5%
1940	4,556		16.0%
1950	5,557		22.0%
1960	7,200		29.6%
1970	7,920		10.0%
1980	9,339		17.9%
1990	9,677		3.6%
2000	11,925		23.2%
2010	13,353		12.0%
2020	14,043		5.2%
U.S. Decennial Census

=== 2020 census ===
As of the 2020 census, South Sioux City had a population of 14,043. The median age was 31.2 years. 30.5% of residents were under the age of 18 and 11.6% of residents were 65 years of age or older. For every 100 females there were 100.0 males, and for every 100 females age 18 and over there were 96.2 males age 18 and over.

99.9% of residents lived in urban areas, while 0.1% lived in rural areas.

There were 4,709 households in South Sioux City, of which 40.9% had children under the age of 18 living in them. Of all households, 45.3% were married-couple households, 19.1% were households with a male householder and no spouse or partner present, and 28.6% were households with a female householder and no spouse or partner present. About 24.6% of all households were made up of individuals and 10.0% had someone living alone who was 65 years of age or older.

There were 4,918 housing units, of which 4.2% were vacant. The homeowner vacancy rate was 0.7% and the rental vacancy rate was 6.0%.

Racial composition as of the 2020 census
Race	Number	Percent
White	5,557	39.6%
Black or African American	1,567	11.2%
American Indian and Alaska Native	465	3.3%
Asian	370	2.6%
Native Hawaiian and Other Pacific Islander	135	1.0%
Some other race	3,446	24.5%
Two or more races	2,503	17.8%
Hispanic or Latino (of any race)	7,122	50.7%

=== 2010 census ===
As of the census of 2010, there were 13,353 people, 4,512 households, and 3,139 families living in the city. The population density was 2,338.5 inhabitants per square mile (902.9/km^{2}). There were 4,739 housing units at an average density of 829.9 per square mile (320.4/km^{2}). The racial makeup of the city was 62.7% White, 4.7% African American, 3.0% Native American, 2.9% Asian, 0.2% Pacific Islander, 23.8% from other races, and 2.8% from two or more races. Hispanic or Latino of any race were 45.3% of the population.

There were 4,512 households, of which 42.7% had children under the age of 18 living with them, 47.5% were married couples living together, 14.9% had a female householder with no husband present, 7.1% had a male householder with no wife present, and 30.4% were non-families. 25.0% of all households were made up of individuals, and 10.4% had someone living alone who was 65 years of age or older. The average household size was 2.93 and the average family size was 3.51.

The median age in the city was 30.5 years. 31.4% of residents were under the age of 18; 10.4% were between the ages of 18 and 24; 26.1% were from 25 to 44; 21.8% were from 45 to 64; and 10.4% were 65 years of age or older. The gender makeup of the city was 49.6% male and 50.4% female.

=== 2000 census ===
As of the census of 2000, there were 11,925 people, 4,304 households, and 2,961 families living in the city. Of the 11,925 people, 48.6% are male and 51.4% are female. The population density was 2,431.6 inhabitants per square mile (938.8/km^{2}). There were 4,557 housing units at an average density of 929.2 per square mile (358.8/km^{2}). The racial makeup of the city was 75.9% White, 0.9% African American, 2.36% Native American, 3.19% Asian, 0.09% Pacific Islander, 14.57% from other races, and 3.05% from two or more races. Hispanic or Latino of any race were 24.8% of the population.

There were 4,304 households, out of which 38.9% had children under the age of 18 living with them, 49.7% were married couples living together, 13.7% had a female householder with no husband present, and 31.2% were non-families. 25.6% of all households were made up of individuals, and 10.3% had someone living alone who was 65 years of age or older. The average household size was 2.72 and the average family size was 3.26.

In the city, the population was spread out, with 29.8% under the age of 18, 11.1% from 18 to 24, 29.6% from 25 to 44, 19.2% from 45 to 64, and 10.4% who were 65 years of age or older. The median age was 31 years. For every 100 females, there were 94.6 males. For every 100 females age 18 and over, there were 92.0 males.

The median income for a household in the city was $36,493, and the median income for a family was $42,712. Males had a median income of $27,259 versus $21,709 for females. The per capita income for the city was $16,165. About 10.1% of families and 11.5% of the population were below the poverty line, including 14.9% of those under age 18 and 8.3% of those age 65 or over.

72.7% of the population held a high school diploma or higher; 12.7% held a bachelor's degree or higher; and 4.8% held a graduate or professional degree. 4.1% of the population were unemployed. Employed residents traveled an average of 15.3 minutes to their jobs.

== Arts and culture ==
- The Annual Art Show is held in April and features artists from across the United States.

Horse racing was held for 58 years at Atokad Downs.

== Infrastructure ==
=== Highways ===
Several highways serve South Sioux City:

- Interstate 129 is a short east–west spur beginning at Interstate 29 in Sioux City. It enters South Sioux City via a bridge over the Missouri River, and crosses the southern end of South Sioux City with interchanges at Dakota Avenue (the city's main street) and U.S. Route 77. Interstate 129 overlaps U.S. routes 20 and 75.

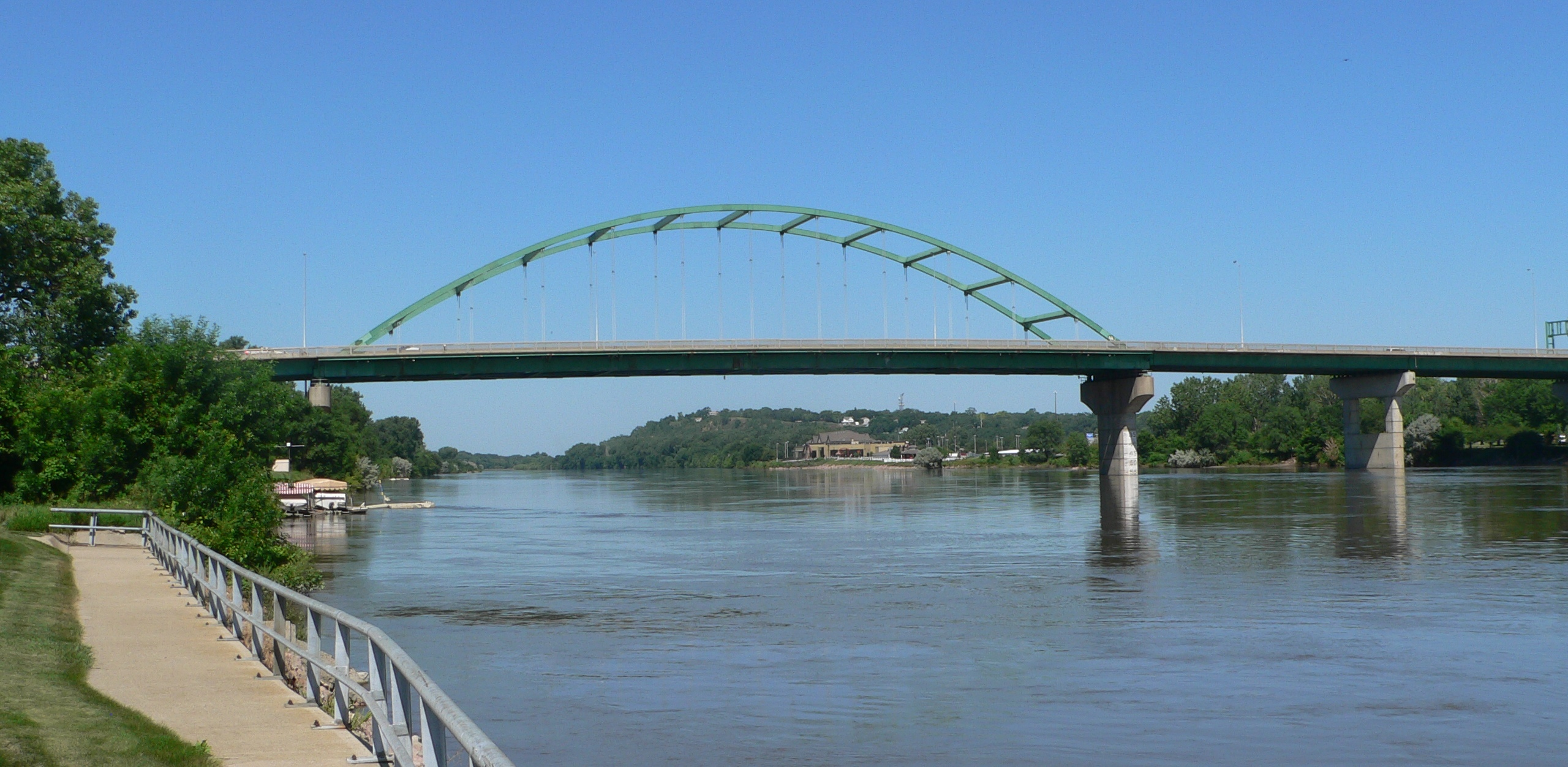
Siouxland Veterans Memorial Bridge

- U.S. Route 77 is a north–south highway whose northern terminus is at Interstate 29 in Sioux City. From there, it enters South Sioux City via the Siouxland Veterans Memorial Bridge, follows Dakota Avenue to 9th Street, then arcs west and south as a four-lane bypass around the city.

=== Public transit ===
Local bus service to South Sioux City is provided by the Sioux City Transit System.

=== Aviation ===
The nearest commercial airport is Sioux Gateway Airport/Colonel Bud Day Field (SUX) in Sioux City. A smaller general-aviation airport, Martin Field (7K8), is located just west of South Sioux City along U.S. Route 20.

== See also ==
- List of municipalities in Nebraska
