= Dakota County, Nebraska =

County in Nebraska, United States

- County
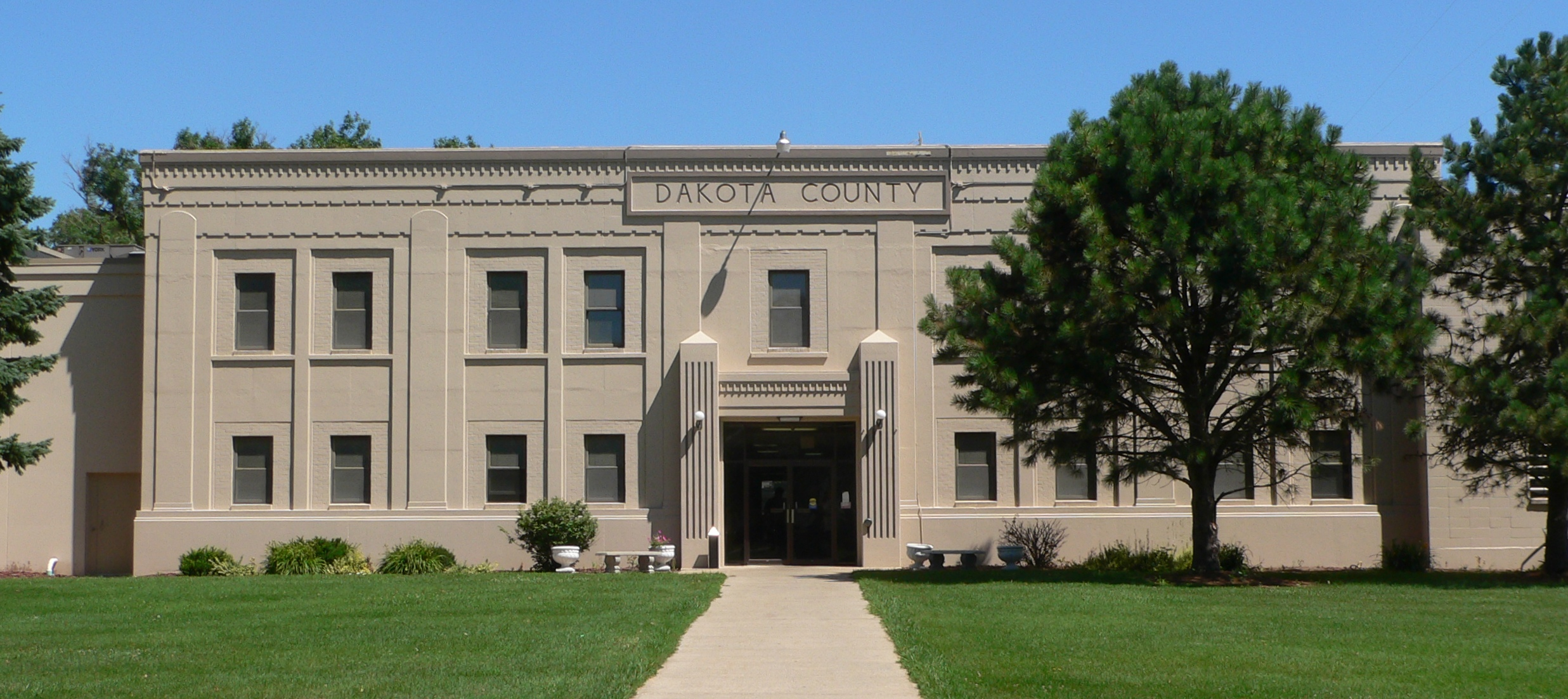
- The Dakota County Courthouse in Dakota City

- Flag

- Location within the U.S. state of Nebraska
- Coordinates: 42.391624°N 96.561327°W
- Country: United States
- State: Nebraska
- Founded: March 16, 1855
- Named for: Dakota people
- Seat: Dakota City
- Largest city: South Sioux City

Area
  - Total: 267.421 sq mi (692.62 km^{2})
  - Land: 264.431 sq mi (684.87 km^{2})
  - Water: 2.990 sq mi (7.74 km^{2}) 1.12%

Population (2020)
  - Total: 21,582
  - Estimate (2025): 21,687 ▲
  - Density: 81.617/sq mi (31.512/km^{2})
- Time zone: UTC−6 (Central)
  - Summer (DST): UTC−5 (CDT)
- Area code: 402 and 531
- Congressional district: 3rd
- Website: dakotacounty.ne.gov
- • Nebraska county number 22 • Nebraska license plate prefix 70

Dakota County is a county in the U.S. state of Nebraska. As of the 2020 census, the population was 21,582, and it was estimated to be 21,687 in 2025. The county seat is Dakota City and the largest city is South Sioux City.

Dakota County is part of the Sioux City metropolitan area.

In the Nebraska license plate system, Dakota County was represented by the prefix "70" (as it had the 70th-largest number of vehicles registered in the state when the license plate system was established in 1922). In August 2009, the Dakota County Board of Commissioners reversed a decision to abandon this system for alphanumeric plates upon introduction of new license plates in 2011. Douglas, Lancaster, and Sarpy Counties remain the only counties with alphanumeric plates in the state.

== History ==
Succeeding cultures of indigenous peoples lived along the Missouri River for millennia. By 1775, the Omaha people had migrated west of the Missouri, where they established a major settlement, Ton-wa-tonga, (the Big Village). It had some 1100 residents. From here, the Omaha controlled fur trading on the upper Missouri River with other tribes and with French-Canadian traders, often called voyageurs. The Omaha were the first of the Northern Plains tribes to have adopted an equestrian culture.

Dakota County was formed by European-American settlers in 1855. They named it after the Dakota Sioux tribe, who were powerful in the area of Nebraska and South Dakota at the time. By this time, the Omaha were concentrated further south in what became the state of Nebraska.

In 1885, the county went to the United States Supreme Court in Dakota County v. Glidden over a dispute with issuing bonds.

As of May 2020, the county had the second-highest per capita COVID-19 infection rate of any American county. About one of every 14 residents has tested positive, mostly at Tyson's large meat packing plant in Dakota City. There were 1452 cases reported as of May 11, 2020. This had increased by July 4, 2020, to 1634 cases, and 38 deaths, giving Dakota County the highest per capita death rate to that date.

== Geography ==
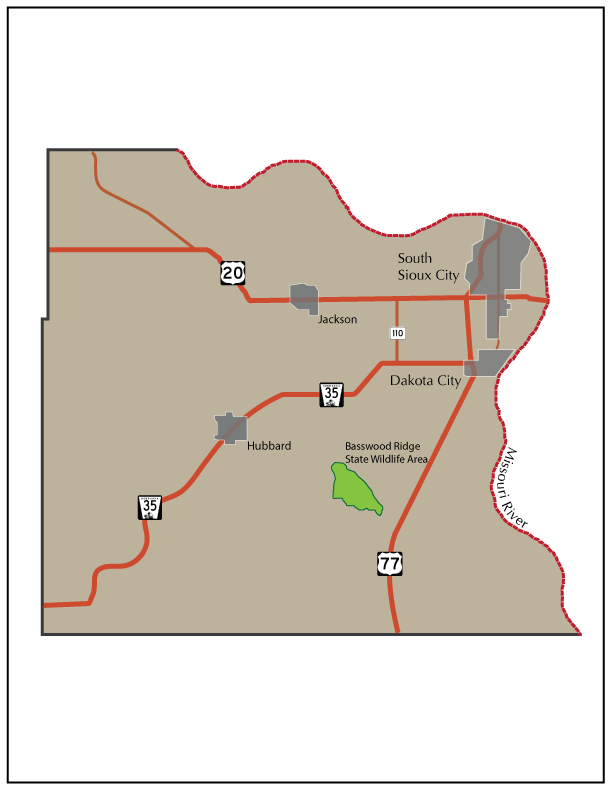
Dakota county and features

Dakota County lies on the northeast line of the Nebraska state line. Its northeast boundary line abuts the southwest boundary lines of the states of South Dakota and Iowa, across the Missouri River. The county terrain consists of rolling prairies and bottom lands.

According to the United States Census Bureau, the county has a total area of 267.421 square miles (692.62 km^{2}), of which 264.431 square miles (684.87 km^{2}) is land and 2.990 square miles (7.74 km^{2}) (1.12%) is water. It is the second-smallest county in Nebraska by total area.

=== Major highways ===
- Interstate 129
- U.S. Highway 20
- U.S. Highway 75
- U.S. Highway 77
- Nebraska Highway 9
- Nebraska Highway 12
- Nebraska Highway 35
- Nebraska Highway 110

=== Transit ===
- Sioux City Transit

=== Adjacent counties ===
- Flag of Dakota County (Via CWflags)
  Union County, South Dakota - northeast
- Woodbury County, Iowa - east
- Thurston County - south
- Dixon County - west

== Demographics ==
Historical population
Census	Pop.	Note	%±
1860	819		—
1870	2,040		149.1%
1880	3,213		57.5%
1890	5,386		67.6%
1900	6,286		16.7%
1910	6,564		4.4%
1920	7,694		17.2%
1930	9,505		23.5%
1940	9,836		3.5%
1950	10,401		5.7%
1960	12,168		17.0%
1970	13,137		8.0%
1980	16,573		26.2%
1990	16,742		1.0%
2000	20,253		21.0%
2010	21,006		3.7%
2020	21,582		2.7%
2025 (est.)	21,687	▲	0.5%
U.S. Decennial Census; 1790–1960 1900–1990; 1990–2000 2010–2020

As of the third quarter of 2025, the median home value in Dakota County was $184,986.

As of the 2024 American Community Survey, there are 7,459 estimated households in Dakota County with an average of 2.84 persons per household. The county has a median household income of $70,329. Approximately 11.5% of the county's population lives at or below the poverty line. Dakota County has an estimated 67.9% employment rate, with 14.6% of the population holding a bachelor's degree or higher and 78.7% holding a high school diploma. There were 7,808 housing units at an average density of 29.53 per square mile (11.4/km^{2}).

The top five reported languages (people were allowed to report up to two languages, thus the figures will generally add to more than 100%) were English (59.4%), Spanish (31.4%), Indo-European (0.2%), Asian and Pacific Islander (3.1%), and Other (5.8%).

The median age in the county was 32.5 years.

Dakota County, Nebraska – racial and ethnic composition Note: the US Census treats Hispanic/Latino as an ethnic category. This table excludes Latinos from the racial categories and assigns them to a separate category. Hispanics/Latinos may be of any race.
Race / ethnicity (NH = non-Hispanic)	Pop. 1980	Pop. 1990	Pop. 2000	Pop. 2010	Pop. 2020
White alone (NH)	15,814 (95.42%)	14,996 (89.57%)	14,368 (70.94%)	11,596 (55.20%)	9,347 (43.31%)
Black or African American alone (NH)	51 (0.31%)	74 (0.44%)	111 (0.55%)	641 (3.05%)	1,603 (7.43%)
Native American or Alaska Native alone (NH)	177 (1.07%)	294 (1.76%)	339 (1.67%)	466 (2.22%)	526 (2.44%)
Asian alone (NH)	46 (0.28%)	336 (2.01%)	619 (3.06%)	621 (2.96%)	602 (2.79%)
Pacific Islander alone (NH)	—	—	8 (0.04%)	43 (0.20%)	154 (0.71%)
Other race alone (NH)	0 (0.00%)	26 (0.16%)	7 (0.03%)	4 (0.02%)	33 (0.15%)
Mixed race or multiracial (NH)	—	—	220 (1.09%)	216 (1.03%)	506 (2.34%)
Hispanic or Latino (any race)	485 (2.93%)	1,016 (6.07%)	4,581 (22.62%)	7,419 (35.32%)	8,811 (40.83%)
Total	16,573 (100.00%)	16,742 (100.00%)	20,253 (100.00%)	21,006 (100.00%)	21,582 (100.00%)

=== 2024 estimate ===
As of the 2024 estimate, there were 21,335 people, 7,459 households, and _ families residing in the county. The population density was 80.68 inhabitants per square mile (31.2/km^{2}). There were 7,808 housing units at an average density of 29.53 per square mile (11.4/km^{2}). The racial makeup of the county was 79.4% White (40.5% NH White), 9.3% African American, 4.4% Native American, 3.4% Asian, 0.9% Pacific Islander, _% from some other races and 2.5% from two or more races. Hispanic or Latino people of any race were 42.7% of the population.

=== 2020 census ===
As of the 2020 census, there were 21,582 people, 7,400 households, and 5,203 families residing in the county. The population density was 81.62 inhabitants per square mile (31.5/km^{2}). There were 7,765 housing units at an average density of 29.36 per square mile (11.3/km^{2}). The racial makeup of the county was 51.10% White, 7.47% African American, 3.29% Native American, 2.82% Asian, 0.71% Pacific Islander, 19.35% from some other races and 15.24% from two or more races. Hispanic or Latino people of any race were 40.83% of the population.

The median age was 33.4 years. 29.0% of residents were under the age of 18 and 13.2% of residents were 65 years of age or older. For every 100 females there were 101.7 males, and for every 100 females age 18 and over there were 99.2 males age 18 and over.

79.4% of residents lived in urban areas, while 20.6% lived in rural areas.

There were 7,400 households in the county, of which 38.3% had children under the age of 18 living with them and 24.8% had a female householder with no spouse or partner present. About 23.8% of all households were made up of individuals and 10.0% had someone living alone who was 65 years of age or older.

There were 7,765 housing units, of which 4.7% were vacant. Among occupied housing units, 64.5% were owner-occupied and 35.5% were renter-occupied. The homeowner vacancy rate was 0.9% and the rental vacancy rate was 5.5%.

=== 2010 census ===
As of the 2010 census, there were 21,006 people, 7,218 households, and _ families residing in the county. The population density was 79.44 inhabitants per square mile (30.7/km^{2}). There were 7,631 housing units at an average density of 28.86 per square mile (11.1/km^{2}). The racial makeup of the county was 70.50% White, 3.14% African American, 2.69% Native American, 3.00% Asian, 0.21% Pacific Islander, 18.15% from some other races and 2.30% from two or more races. Hispanic or Latino people of any race were 35.32% of the population.

=== 2000 census ===
As of the 2000 census, there were 20,253 people, 7,095 households, and 5,087 families residing in the county. The population density was 76.59 inhabitants per square mile (29.6/km^{2}). There were 7,528 housing units at an average density of 28.47 per square mile (11.0/km^{2}). The racial makeup of the county was 78.84% White, 0.62% African American, 1.86% Native American, 3.08% Asian, 0.06% Pacific Islander, 12.91% from some other races and 2.62% from two or more races. Hispanic or Latino people of any race were 22.62% of the population. 28.0% were of German and 10.5% Irish ancestry.

There were 7,095 households, out of which 39.90% had children under the age of 18 living with them, 54.60% were married couples living together, 11.90% had a female householder with no husband present, and 28.30% were non-families. 22.90% of all households were made up of individuals, and 9.00% had someone living alone who was 65 years of age or older. The average household size was 2.81 and the average family size was 3.30.

The county population contained 30.50% under the age of 18, 10.10% from 18 to 24, 29.40% from 25 to 44, 20.10% from 45 to 64, and 9.90% who were 65 years of age or older. The median age was 31 years. For every 100 females, there were 99.70 males. For every 100 females age 18 and over, there were 97.10 males.

The median income for a household in the county was $38,834, and the median income for a family was $43,702. Males had a median income of $28,341 versus $22,035 for females. The per capita income for the county was $16,125. About 9.20% of families and 11.40% of the population were below the poverty line, including 14.60% of those under age 18 and 8.60% of those age 65 or over.

== Communities ==
=== Cities ===
- Dakota City (county seat)
- South Sioux City

=== Villages ===
- Emerson (partial)
- Homer
- Hubbard
- Jackson

=== Unincorporated communities ===
- Goodwin
- Nacora
- Willis

== Politics ==
Dakota County voters have leaned Republican for several decades. From 1952, the county has selected the Republican Party candidate in over 80% of national elections, but the significant Hispanic population has led to the margins of victory not being as wide as those in most rural counties in the state.

United States presidential election results for Dakota County, Nebraska
Year	Republican		Democratic		Third party(ies)	
Year	No.	%	No.	%	No.	%
1900	692	46.35%	777	52.04%	24	1.61%
1904	855	63.52%	399	29.64%	92	6.84%
1908	729	48.96%	716	48.09%	44	2.96%
1912	408	28.53%	612	42.80%	410	28.67%
1916	612	36.45%	1,032	61.47%	35	2.08%
1920	1,525	62.58%	873	35.82%	39	1.60%
1924	1,235	39.38%	964	30.74%	937	29.88%
1928	1,709	49.35%	1,754	50.65%	0	0.00%
1932	863	21.92%	3,044	77.32%	30	0.76%
1936	1,264	29.52%	2,741	64.01%	277	6.47%
1940	2,140	46.91%	2,422	53.09%	0	0.00%
1944	1,703	46.13%	1,989	53.87%	0	0.00%
1948	1,379	36.76%	2,372	63.24%	0	0.00%
1952	2,643	57.38%	1,963	42.62%	0	0.00%
1956	2,516	53.08%	2,224	46.92%	0	0.00%
1960	2,977	56.13%	2,327	43.87%	0	0.00%
1964	1,906	41.80%	2,654	58.20%	0	0.00%
1968	2,383	56.60%	1,541	36.60%	286	6.79%
1972	2,879	62.22%	1,748	37.78%	0	0.00%
1976	2,631	52.67%	2,292	45.89%	72	1.44%
1980	3,165	57.67%	1,930	35.17%	393	7.16%
1984	3,467	57.76%	2,510	41.82%	25	0.42%
1988	2,744	48.17%	2,942	51.64%	11	0.19%
1992	2,793	43.21%	2,335	36.12%	1,336	20.67%
1996	2,592	43.31%	2,632	43.98%	761	12.72%
2000	3,119	51.46%	2,695	44.46%	247	4.08%
2004	3,526	53.30%	3,027	45.76%	62	0.94%
2008	3,292	51.47%	2,994	46.81%	110	1.72%
2012	3,094	50.42%	2,922	47.62%	120	1.96%
2016	3,616	57.59%	2,314	36.85%	349	5.56%
2020	3,926	57.59%	2,744	40.25%	147	2.16%
2024	3,934	64.09%	2,109	34.36%	95	1.55%

== Education ==
School districts include:

- Emerson-Hubbard Public Schools, Emerson
- Allen Consolidated Schools, Allen
- Homer Community Schools, Homer
- Ponca Public Schools, Ponca
- South Sioux City Community Schools, South Sioux City

== See also ==
- National Register of Historic Places listings in Dakota County, Nebraska
