= 1940 Murray State Thoroughbreds football team =

American college football season

1940 Murray State Thoroughbreds football
- Conference: Kentucky Intercollegiate Athletic Conference, Southern Intercollegiate Athletic Association
- Record: 4–3–2 (0–1–1 KIAC, 4–2–1 SIAA)
- Head coach: Roy Stewart (9th season)

1940 Kentucky Intercollegiate Athletic Conference football standings
	Conf.					Overall
Team	W		L		T	W		L		T
Centre $	2	–	0	–	0	3	–	6	–	0
Eastern Kentucky	1	–	0	–	0	8	–	0	–	0
Western Kentucky State Teachers	1	–	0	–	1	7	–	1	–	1
Georgetown (KY)	2	–	1	–	0	5	–	3	–	2
Transylvania	1	–	2	–	1	5	–	3	–	1
Morehead State	1	–	1	–	2	3	–	2	–	2
Union (KY)	0	–	1	–	1	5	–	1	–	1
Murray State	0	–	1	–	1	4	–	3	–	2
Louisville	0	–	2	–	0	3	–	5	–	1
$ – Conference champion

1940 Southern Intercollegiate Athletic Association football standings
	Conf.					Overall
Team	W		L		T	W		L		T
Rollins $	6	–	0	–	0	8	–	1	–	0
Newberry	4	–	0	–	0	7	–	2	–	1
Mississippi College	2	–	0	–	0	5	–	1	–	1
Eastern Kentucky	1	–	0	–	0	8	–	0	–	0
Western Kentucky State Teachers	4	–	1	–	1	7	–	1	–	1
Louisiana Normal	4	–	1	–	1	6	–	3	–	1
SW Louisiana	4	–	1	–	0	6	–	3	–	1
Union (TN)	3	–	1	–	0	6	–	3	–	0
Georgetown (KY)	2	–	1	–	0	5	–	3	–	2
Murray State	4	–	2	–	1	4	–	3	–	2
Centre	2	–	1	–	0	3	–	6	–	0
Miami (FL)	2	–	1	–	0	3	–	7	–	0
Presbyterian	5	–	3	–	0	6	–	4	–	0
Mississippi Southern	3	–	2	–	0	7	–	4	–	0
Louisiana Tech	3	–	2	–	0	6	–	4	–	0
West Tennessee State Teachers	4	–	3	–	0	5	–	5	–	0
Morehead State	1	–	1	–	2	3	–	3	–	2
Wofford	2	–	2	–	1	3	–	4	–	2
Middle Tennessee State Teachers	2	–	4	–	0	4	–	4	–	0
Tampa	2	–	4	–	0	3	–	6	–	0
Oglethorpe	2	–	4	–	0	2	–	6	–	0
Tennessee Tech	1	–	2	–	0	2	–	6	–	0
Transylvania	1	–	2	–	1	5	–	3	–	1
Stetson	2	–	5	–	1	2	–	5	–	1
Troy State	1	–	3	–	0	3	–	6	–	0
Louisiana College	1	–	4	–	2	2	–	5	–	2
Union (KY)	0	–	1	–	1	5	–	1	–	1
Centenary	0	–	2	–	0	3	–	7	–	0
Louisville	0	–	2	–	0	3	–	5	–	1
Jacksonville State	0	–	2	–	0	3	–	5	–	0
Erskine	0	–	5	–	0	1	–	8	–	0
Delta State	0	–	5	–	1	0	–	8	–	2
$ – Conference champion

The 1940 Murray State Thoroughbreds football team represented Murray State Teachers College—now known as Murray State University—as a member the Kentucky Intercollegiate Athletic Conference (KIAC) and the Southern Intercollegiate Athletic Association (SIAA) during the 1940 college football season. Led by ninth-year head coach Roy Stewart, the Thoroughbreds compiled an overall record of 4–3–2 with marks of 0–1–1 in KIAC play and 4–2–1 against SIAA opponents.

== Schedule ==
Date	Time	Opponent	Site	Result	Attendance	Source
September 27		at Louisiana Normal	Demon Stadium; Natchitoches, LA	L 6–20		
October 5		vs. Morehead State	Ashland, KY	T 0–0		
October 11	9:15 p.m.	Arkansas State Teachers*	Murray, KY	T 0–0	4,000	
October 19		at East Texas State*	Commerce, TX	L 14–21		
October 25		at Union (TN)	Rothrock Field; Jackson, TN	W 14–11		
November 2		Delta State	Murray, KY	W 41–0	4,000	
November 9		West Tennessee State Teachers	Murray, KY	W 35–6	4,500	
November 16	2:00 p.m.	at Middle Tennessee State Teachers	Horace Jones Field; Murfreesboro, TN	W 18–0		
November 23		Western Kentucky State Teachers	Murray, KY (rivalry)	L 0–6	5,000	
*Non-conference game; All times are in Central time
