= 1940 Southwestern Louisiana Bulldogs football team =

American college football season

1940 Southwestern Louisiana Bulldogs football

LIC champion
- Conference: Louisiana Intercollegiate Conference, Southern Intercollegiate Athletic Association
- Record: 6–3–1 (4–0 LIC, 4–1 SIAA)
- Head coach: Johnny Cain (4th season)
- Home stadium: McNaspy Stadium

1940 Louisiana Intercollegiate Conference football standings
	Conf.					Overall
Team	W		L		T	W		L		T
Southwestern Louisiana $	4	–	0	–	0	6	–	3	–	1
Louisiana Normal	3	–	1	–	1	6	–	3	–	1
Louisiana Tech	3	–	2	–	0	6	–	4	–	0
Louisiana College	0	–	2	–	1	2	–	5	–	2
Centenary	0	–	2	–	0	3	–	7	–	0
Southeastern Louisiana	0	–	3	–	0	3	–	6	–	1
$ – Conference champion

1940 Southern Intercollegiate Athletic Association football standings
	Conf.					Overall
Team	W		L		T	W		L		T
Rollins $	6	–	0	–	0	8	–	1	–	0
Newberry	4	–	0	–	0	7	–	2	–	1
Mississippi College	2	–	0	–	0	5	–	1	–	1
Eastern Kentucky	1	–	0	–	0	8	–	0	–	0
Western Kentucky State Teachers	4	–	1	–	1	7	–	1	–	1
Louisiana Normal	4	–	1	–	1	6	–	3	–	1
SW Louisiana	4	–	1	–	0	6	–	3	–	1
Union (TN)	3	–	1	–	0	6	–	3	–	0
Georgetown (KY)	2	–	1	–	0	5	–	3	–	2
Murray State	4	–	2	–	1	4	–	3	–	2
Centre	2	–	1	–	0	3	–	6	–	0
Miami (FL)	2	–	1	–	0	3	–	7	–	0
Presbyterian	5	–	3	–	0	6	–	4	–	0
Mississippi Southern	3	–	2	–	0	7	–	4	–	0
Louisiana Tech	3	–	2	–	0	6	–	4	–	0
West Tennessee State Teachers	4	–	3	–	0	5	–	5	–	0
Morehead State	1	–	1	–	2	3	–	3	–	2
Wofford	2	–	2	–	1	3	–	4	–	2
Middle Tennessee State Teachers	2	–	4	–	0	4	–	4	–	0
Tampa	2	–	4	–	0	3	–	6	–	0
Oglethorpe	2	–	4	–	0	2	–	6	–	0
Tennessee Tech	1	–	2	–	0	2	–	6	–	0
Transylvania	1	–	2	–	1	5	–	3	–	1
Stetson	2	–	5	–	1	2	–	5	–	1
Troy State	1	–	3	–	0	3	–	6	–	0
Louisiana College	1	–	4	–	2	2	–	5	–	2
Union (KY)	0	–	1	–	1	5	–	1	–	1
Centenary	0	–	2	–	0	3	–	7	–	0
Louisville	0	–	2	–	0	3	–	5	–	1
Jacksonville State	0	–	2	–	0	3	–	5	–	0
Erskine	0	–	5	–	0	1	–	8	–	0
Delta State	0	–	5	–	1	0	–	8	–	2
$ – Conference champion

The 1940 Southwestern Louisiana Bulldogs football team was an American football team that represented the Southwestern Louisiana Institute of Liberal and Technical Learning (now known as the University of Louisiana at Lafayette) as a member of the Louisiana Intercollegiate Conference (LIC) and the Southern Intercollegiate Athletic Association (SIAA) during the 1940 college football season. In their fourth year under head coach Johnny Cain, the Bulldogs compiled an overall record of 6–3–1.

Southwestern Louisiana was ranked at No. 293 (out of 697 college football teams) in the final rankings under the Litkenhous Difference by Score system for 1940.

== Schedule ==
Date	Opponent	Site	Result	Attendance	Source
September 20	Southeastern Louisiana	McNaspy Stadium; Lafayette, LA (rivalry)	W 7–0		
September 27	at Stephen F. Austin*	Birdwell Field; Nacogdoches, TX	W 6–0		
October 5	at Mississippi State*	Scott Field; Starkville, MS	L 0–20	7,000	
October 11	Millsaps*	McNaspy Stadium; Lafayette, LA	T 0–0	6,000	
October 18	at Spring Hill*	Dorn Stadium; Mobile, AL	L 7–13		
October 26	vs. Louisiana College	State Fair Stadium; Shreveport, LA	W 6–0	3,000	
November 1	Louisiana Tech	McNaspy Stadium; Lafayette, LA (rivalry)	W 7–6		
November 8	Delta State	McNaspy Stadium; Lafayette, LA	W 18–7		
November 15	at Mississippi Southern	Faulkner Field; Hattiesburg, MS	L 14–21		
November 28	Louisiana Normal	McNaspy Stadium; Lafayette, LA	W 12–7	6,000	
*Non-conference game
