= 1940 Presbyterian Blue Hose football team =

American college football season

1940 Presbyterian Blue Hose football
- Conference: Southern Intercollegiate Athletic Association
- Record: 6–4 (5–3 SIAA)
- Head coach: Walter A. Johnson (25th season)
- Home stadium: Bailey Stadium

1940 Southern Intercollegiate Athletic Association football standings
| | Conf. | | | | | Overall |
| Team | W | | L | | T | W | | L | | T |
|---|---|---|---|---|---|---|---|---|---|---|
| Rollins $ | 6 | – | 0 | – | 0 | 8 | – | 1 | – | 0 |
| Newberry | 4 | – | 0 | – | 0 | 7 | – | 2 | – | 1 |
| Mississippi College | 2 | – | 0 | – | 0 | 5 | – | 1 | – | 1 |
| Eastern Kentucky | 1 | – | 0 | – | 0 | 8 | – | 0 | – | 0 |
| Western Kentucky State Teachers | 4 | – | 1 | – | 1 | 7 | – | 1 | – | 1 |
| Louisiana Normal | 4 | – | 1 | – | 1 | 6 | – | 3 | – | 1 |
| SW Louisiana | 4 | – | 1 | – | 0 | 6 | – | 3 | – | 1 |
| Union (TN) | 3 | – | 1 | – | 0 | 6 | – | 3 | – | 0 |
| Georgetown (KY) | 2 | – | 1 | – | 0 | 5 | – | 3 | – | 2 |
| Murray State | 4 | – | 2 | – | 1 | 4 | – | 3 | – | 2 |
| Centre | 2 | – | 1 | – | 0 | 3 | – | 6 | – | 0 |
| Miami (FL) | 2 | – | 1 | – | 0 | 3 | – | 7 | – | 0 |
| Presbyterian | 5 | – | 3 | – | 0 | 6 | – | 4 | – | 0 |
| Mississippi Southern | 3 | – | 2 | – | 0 | 7 | – | 4 | – | 0 |
| Louisiana Tech | 3 | – | 2 | – | 0 | 6 | – | 4 | – | 0 |
| West Tennessee State Teachers | 4 | – | 3 | – | 0 | 5 | – | 5 | – | 0 |
| Morehead State | 1 | – | 1 | – | 2 | 3 | – | 3 | – | 2 |
| Wofford | 2 | – | 2 | – | 1 | 3 | – | 4 | – | 2 |
| Middle Tennessee State Teachers | 2 | – | 4 | – | 0 | 4 | – | 4 | – | 0 |
| Tampa | 2 | – | 4 | – | 0 | 3 | – | 6 | – | 0 |
| Oglethorpe | 2 | – | 4 | – | 0 | 2 | – | 6 | – | 0 |
| Tennessee Tech | 1 | – | 2 | – | 0 | 2 | – | 6 | – | 0 |
| Transylvania | 1 | – | 2 | – | 1 | 5 | – | 3 | – | 1 |
| Stetson | 2 | – | 5 | – | 1 | 2 | – | 5 | – | 1 |
| Troy State | 1 | – | 3 | – | 0 | 3 | – | 6 | – | 0 |
| Louisiana College | 1 | – | 4 | – | 2 | 2 | – | 5 | – | 2 |
| Union (KY) | 0 | – | 1 | – | 1 | 5 | – | 1 | – | 1 |
| Centenary | 0 | – | 2 | – | 0 | 3 | – | 7 | – | 0 |
| Louisville | 0 | – | 2 | – | 0 | 3 | – | 5 | – | 1 |
| Jacksonville State | 0 | – | 2 | – | 0 | 3 | – | 5 | – | 0 |
| Erskine | 0 | – | 5 | – | 0 | 1 | – | 8 | – | 0 |
| Delta State | 0 | – | 5 | – | 1 | 0 | – | 8 | – | 2 |
$ – Conference champion

The 1940 Presbyterian Blue Hose football team represented Presbyterian College as a member the Southern Intercollegiate Athletic Association (SIAA) during the 1940 college football season. Led Walter A. Johnson in his 25th and final season as head coach, the Blue Hose compiled an overall record of 6–4 with a mark of 5–3 in conference play.

== Schedule ==
| Date | Time | Opponent | Site | Result | Attendance | Source |
|---|---|---|---|---|---|---|
| September 21 | 3:00 p.m. | Clemson* | Bailey Stadium; Clinton, SC | L 0–38 | 8,000 | |
| September 27 | 8:00 p.m. | Rollins | Bailey Stadium; Clinton, SC | L 7–20 | 1,500 | |
| October 5 | 3:30 p.m. | at Western Kentucky State Teachers | Western Stadium; Bowling Green, KY | L 7–26 | | |
| October 11 | 8:00 p.m. | at Newberry | Setzler Field; Newberry, SC | L 7–20 | 4,000 | |
| October 18 | 2:30 p.m. | vs. The Citadel* | Sumter County Fairgrounds; Sumter, SC | W 19–0 | 2,500 | |
| November 1 | 9:00 p.m. | vs. Mercer* | Municipal Stadium; Albany, GA | W 3–2 | | |
| November 9 | 8:00 p.m. | vs. Erskine | Municipal Stadium; Rock Hill, SC | W 14–7 | 2,500 | |
| November 16 | 2:30 p.m. | Wofford^{†} | Bailey Stadium; Clinton, SC | W 12–6 | 2,200 | |
| November 22 | | vs. Stetson | Ocala, FL | W 6–0 | 2,000 | |
| November 29 | 2:15 p.m. | at Oglethorpe | Hermance Stadium; North Atlanta, GA | W 20–6 | | |
*Non-conference game; ^{†}Homecoming; All times are in Eastern time
