= 1940 Tampa Spartans football team =

American college football season

1940 Tampa Spartans football
- Conference: Southern Intercollegiate Athletic Association
- Record: 3–6 (2–4 SIAA)
- Head coach: Nash Higgins (8th season)
- Home stadium: Phillips Field

1940 Southern Intercollegiate Athletic Association football standings
	Conf.					Overall
Team	W		L		T	W		L		T
Rollins $	6	–	0	–	0	8	–	1	–	0
Newberry	4	–	0	–	0	7	–	2	–	1
Mississippi College	2	–	0	–	0	5	–	1	–	1
Eastern Kentucky	1	–	0	–	0	8	–	0	–	0
Western Kentucky State Teachers	4	–	1	–	1	7	–	1	–	1
Louisiana Normal	4	–	1	–	1	6	–	3	–	1
SW Louisiana	4	–	1	–	0	6	–	3	–	1
Union (TN)	3	–	1	–	0	6	–	3	–	0
Georgetown (KY)	2	–	1	–	0	5	–	3	–	2
Murray State	4	–	2	–	1	4	–	3	–	2
Centre	2	–	1	–	0	3	–	6	–	0
Miami (FL)	2	–	1	–	0	3	–	7	–	0
Presbyterian	5	–	3	–	0	6	–	4	–	0
Mississippi Southern	3	–	2	–	0	7	–	4	–	0
Louisiana Tech	3	–	2	–	0	6	–	4	–	0
West Tennessee State Teachers	4	–	3	–	0	5	–	5	–	0
Morehead State	1	–	1	–	2	3	–	3	–	2
Wofford	2	–	2	–	1	3	–	4	–	2
Middle Tennessee State Teachers	2	–	4	–	0	4	–	4	–	0
Tampa	2	–	4	–	0	3	–	6	–	0
Oglethorpe	2	–	4	–	0	2	–	6	–	0
Tennessee Tech	1	–	2	–	0	2	–	6	–	0
Transylvania	1	–	2	–	1	5	–	3	–	1
Stetson	2	–	5	–	1	2	–	5	–	1
Troy State	1	–	3	–	0	3	–	6	–	0
Louisiana College	1	–	4	–	2	2	–	5	–	2
Union (KY)	0	–	1	–	1	5	–	1	–	1
Centenary	0	–	2	–	0	3	–	7	–	0
Louisville	0	–	2	–	0	3	–	5	–	1
Jacksonville State	0	–	2	–	0	3	–	5	–	0
Erskine	0	–	5	–	0	1	–	8	–	0
Delta State	0	–	5	–	1	0	–	8	–	2
$ – Conference champion

The 1940 Tampa Spartans football team was an American football team that represented the University of Tampa as a member of the Southern Intercollegiate Athletic Association (SIAA) during the 1940 college football season. In their eighth year under head coach Nash Higgins, the Spartans compiled an overall record of 3–6 with a mark of 2–4 in conference play.

Tampa was ranked at No. 223 (out of 697 college football teams) in the final rankings under the Litkenhous Difference by Score system for 1940.

== Schedule ==
Date	Time	Opponent	Site	Result	Attendance	Source
September 14		at Appalachian State*	College Field; Boone, NC	L 6–13		
September 27	8:00 p.m.	Stetson	Phillips Field; Tampa, FL	W 6–0	6,500–7,000	
October 5		Florida*	Phillips Field; Tampa, FL	L 0–23	8,000	
October 11		at Miami (FL)	Burdine Stadium; Miami, FL	L 0–27	14,000	
October 18		at Rollins	Orlando Stadium; Orlando, FL	L 0–39	3,000	
October 26	8:00 p.m.	Georgia Teachers*	Phillips Field; Tampa, FL	W 64–14	2,500	
November 2	3:00 p.m.	at Stetson	Hulley Field; DeLand, FL	L 13–19	2,500–3,000	
November 8		Oglethorpe	Phillips Field; Tampa, FL	W 52–0		
November 22		Rollins	Phillips Field; Tampa, FL	L 6–20	4,000	
*Non-conference game; All times are in Eastern time
