= Louisiana Normal/Northwestern State Demons football, 1940–1949 =

American college football seasons

The Louisiana Normal/Northwestern State Demons football program, 1940–1949 represented the Louisiana State Normal School through 1944 and Northwestern State College of Louisiana from 1945 onwards (now known as Northwestern State University), during the 1940s in college football. For the entirity of the decade, the Demons were led by head coach Harry Turpin and had an overall record for the decade of 38–36–5. During this decade, the Demons played their home games on campus at Demon Stadium in Natchitoches, Louisiana.

In both the 1940 and 1941 seasons, the Demons competed as a member of both the Louisiana Intercollegiate Conference (LIC) and the Southern Intercollegiate Athletic Association (SIAA). After they withdrew from the SIAA, they competed as a member of the LIC through their 1947 season, excluding 1943 when the program was disbanded as a result of World War II, and won a conference championship in 1942. Northwestern State finished the decade as a member of the Gulf States Conference for their 1948 and 1949 seasons.

== 1940 ==
1940 Louisiana Normal Demons football
- Conference: Louisiana Intercollegiate Conference, Southern Intercollegiate Athletic Association
- Record: 6–3–1 (3–1–1 LIC, 4–1–1 SIAA)
- Head coach: Harry Turpin (7th season)
- Home stadium: Demon Stadium

1940 Louisiana Intercollegiate Conference football standings
	Conf.					Overall
Team	W		L		T	W		L		T
Southwestern Louisiana $	4	–	0	–	0	6	–	3	–	1
Louisiana Normal	3	–	1	–	1	6	–	3	–	1
Louisiana Tech	3	–	2	–	0	6	–	4	–	0
Louisiana College	0	–	2	–	1	2	–	5	–	2
Centenary	0	–	2	–	0	3	–	7	–	0
Southeastern Louisiana	0	–	3	–	0	3	–	6	–	1
$ – Conference champion

1940 Southern Intercollegiate Athletic Association football standings
	Conf.					Overall
Team	W		L		T	W		L		T
Rollins $	6	–	0	–	0	8	–	1	–	0
Newberry	4	–	0	–	0	7	–	2	–	1
Mississippi College	2	–	0	–	0	5	–	1	–	1
Eastern Kentucky	1	–	0	–	0	8	–	0	–	0
Western Kentucky State Teachers	4	–	1	–	1	7	–	1	–	1
Louisiana Normal	4	–	1	–	1	6	–	3	–	1
SW Louisiana	4	–	1	–	0	6	–	3	–	1
Union (TN)	3	–	1	–	0	6	–	3	–	0
Georgetown (KY)	2	–	1	–	0	5	–	3	–	2
Murray State	4	–	2	–	1	4	–	3	–	2
Centre	2	–	1	–	0	3	–	6	–	0
Miami (FL)	2	–	1	–	0	3	–	7	–	0
Presbyterian	5	–	3	–	0	6	–	4	–	0
Mississippi Southern	3	–	2	–	0	7	–	4	–	0
Louisiana Tech	3	–	2	–	0	6	–	4	–	0
West Tennessee State Teachers	4	–	3	–	0	5	–	5	–	0
Morehead State	1	–	1	–	2	3	–	3	–	2
Wofford	2	–	2	–	1	3	–	4	–	2
Middle Tennessee State Teachers	2	–	4	–	0	4	–	4	–	0
Tampa	2	–	4	–	0	3	–	6	–	0
Oglethorpe	2	–	4	–	0	2	–	6	–	0
Tennessee Tech	1	–	2	–	0	2	–	6	–	0
Transylvania	1	–	2	–	1	5	–	3	–	1
Stetson	2	–	5	–	1	2	–	5	–	1
Troy State	1	–	3	–	0	3	–	6	–	0
Louisiana College	1	–	4	–	2	2	–	5	–	2
Union (KY)	0	–	1	–	1	5	–	1	–	1
Centenary	0	–	2	–	0	3	–	7	–	0
Louisville	0	–	2	–	0	3	–	5	–	1
Jacksonville State	0	–	2	–	0	3	–	5	–	0
Erskine	0	–	5	–	0	1	–	8	–	0
Delta State	0	–	5	–	1	0	–	8	–	2
$ – Conference champion

The 1940 Louisiana Normal Demons football team was an American football team that represented the Louisiana State Normal School (now known as Northwestern State University) as a member of the Louisiana Intercollegiate Conference (LIC) and the Southern Intercollegiate Athletic Association (SIAA) during the 1940 college football season. Led by seventh-year head coach Harry Turpin, the Demons compiled an overall record of 6–3–1 with mark of 3–1–1 in LIC play and 4–1–1 in SIAA play.

Schedule

Date	Time	Opponent	Site	Result	Attendance	Source
September 27		Murray State	Demon Stadium; Natchitoches, LA	W 20–6		
October 4		Southeastern Louisiana	Demon Stadium; Natchitoches, LA (rivalry)	W 32–0		
October 12	8:00 p.m.	at Louisiana College	Alumni Field; Pineville, LA	T 7–7		
October 19	2:30 p.m.	vs. Louisiana Tech	State Fair Stadium; Shreveport, LA (rivalry)	W 13–0	7,500	
October 25		Centenary	Demon Stadium; Natchitoches, LA	W 7–0	6,000	
November 2		at Stephen F. Austin*	Demon Stadium; Nacogdoches, TX (rivalry)	L 7–14		
November 9		Mississippi Southern^{†}	Demon Stadium; Natchitoches, LA	W 9–6		
November 15		at Ouachita*	Arkadelphia, AR	W 7–14		
November 23	2:00 p.m.	at Tulane*	Tulane Stadium; New Orleans, LA	L 47–0	20,000	
November 28		at Southwestern Louisiana	McNaspy Stadium; Lafayette, LA	L 7–12	6,000	
*Non-conference game; ^{†}Homecoming; All times are in Central time

== 1941 ==
1941 Louisiana Normal Demons football
- Conference: Louisiana Intercollegiate Conference, Southern Intercollegiate Athletic Association
- Record: 4–3–1 (2–2–1 LIC, 3–3–1 SIAA)
- Head coach: Harry Turpin (8th season)
- Home stadium: Demon Stadium

1941 Louisiana Intercollegiate Conference football standings
	Conf.					Overall
Team	W		L		T	W		L		T
Louisiana Tech $	5	–	0	–	0	5	–	4	–	1
Southwestern Louisiana	3	–	1	–	0	6	–	2	–	1
Louisiana Normal	2	–	2	–	1	4	–	3	–	1
Southeastern Louisiana	1	–	3	–	0	4	–	5	–	0
Centenary	0	–	1	–	1	0	–	8	–	2
Louisiana College	0	–	4	–	0	4	–	7	–	0
$ – Conference champion

1941 Southern Intercollegiate Athletic Association football standings
	Conf.					Overall
Team	W		L		T	W		L		T
Presbyterian $	5	–	0	–	0	6	–	3	–	0
Miami (FL)	2	–	0	–	0	8	–	2	–	0
Centre	2	–	0	–	0	3	–	4	–	0
Mississippi Southern	6	–	0	–	1	9	–	0	–	1
Louisiana Tech	5	–	1	–	0	5	–	4	–	1
Eastern Kentucky	3	–	1	–	0	7	–	1	–	0
SW Louisiana	3	–	1	–	1	6	–	2	–	1
Union (TN)	3	–	1	–	1	5	–	3	–	1
Tennessee Tech	3	–	1	–	0	5	–	4	–	0
Western Kentucky State Teachers	3	–	1	–	1	4	–	5	–	1
Georgetown (KY)	2	–	1	–	0	7	–	2	–	0
Wofford	2	–	1	–	0	4	–	6	–	0
Memphis State	3	–	2	–	0	6	–	3	–	0
Rollins	2	–	2	–	0	5	–	2	–	1
Louisiana Normal	3	–	3	–	1	4	–	3	–	1
Murray State	3	–	3	–	2	4	–	3	–	2
Tampa	2	–	2	–	0	5	–	4	–	0
Louisville	1	–	1	–	0	4	–	4	–	0
Middle Tennessee State Teachers	2	–	3	–	1	4	–	3	–	1
Newberry	2	–	3	–	0	5	–	6	–	0
Mississippi College	1	–	2	–	0	5	–	3	–	0
SE Louisiana	2	–	4	–	0	3	–	6	–	0
Oglethorpe	1	–	3	–	0	3	–	3	–	0
Transylvania	1	–	3	–	0	3	–	5	–	0
Troy State	1	–	4	–	0	5	–	4	–	0
Southeastern Louisiana	0	–	3	–	0	3	–	6	–	1
Louisiana College	1	–	5	–	0	4	–	7	–	0
Delta State	1	–	7	–	1	1	–	8	–	1
Centenary	0	–	1	–	1	0	–	8	–	2
Union (KY)	0	–	1	–	0	0	–	5	–	0
Morehead State	0	–	3	–	0	3	–	4	–	0
Erskine	0	–	4	–	0	2	–	5	–	0
$ – Conference champion

The 1941 Louisiana Normal Demons football team was an American football team that represented the Louisiana State Normal School (now known as Northwestern State University) as a member of the Louisiana Intercollegiate Conference (LIC) and the Southern Intercollegiate Athletic Association (SIAA) during the 1941 college football season. Led by eighth-year head coach Harry Turpin, the Demons compiled an overall record of 4–3–1 with mark of 2–2–1 in LIC play and 3–3–1 in SIAA play.

Louisiana Normal was ranked at No. 228 (out of 681 teams) in the final rankings under the Litkenhous Difference by Score System.

Schedule

Date	Opponent	Site	Result	Attendance	Source
September 20	Delta State	Demon Stadium; Natchitoches, LA	W 44–0	4,000	
October 4	at Centenary	Centenary Field; Shreveport, LA	T 6–6	5,500	
October 10	Louisiana College	Demon Stadium; Natchitoches, LA	W 7–0		
October 18	vs. Louisiana Tech	State Fair Stadium; Shreveport, LA (rivalry)	L 0–10	8,000	
October 31	at Southeastern Louisiana	Strawberry Stadium; Hammond, LA (rivalry)	W 6–0	3,000	
November 7	at Mississippi Southern	Faulkner Field; Hattiesburg, MS	L 7–21	2,500	
November 15	Ouachita Baptist*	Demon Stadium; Natchitoches, LA	W 7–6		
November 27	Southwestern Louisiana	Demon Stadium; Natchitoches, LA	L 0–6		
*Non-conference game

== 1942 ==
1942 Louisiana Normal Demons football

LIC champion
- Conference: Louisiana Intercollegiate Conference
- Record: 6–2 (3–0 LIC)
- Head coach: Harry Turpin (9th season)
- Home stadium: Demon Stadium

1942 Louisiana Intercollegiate Conference football standings
	Conf.					Overall
Team	W		L		T	W		L		T
Louisiana Normal $	3	–	0	–	0	6	–	2	–	0
Southwestern Louisiana	2	–	1	–	0	3	–	4	–	0
Louisiana Tech	1	–	2	–	0	6	–	3	–	0
Southeastern Louisiana	0	–	3	–	0	5	–	5	–	0
$ – Conference champion

The 1942 Louisiana Normal Demons football team was an American football team that represented the Louisiana State Normal School (now known as Northwestern State University) as a member of the Louisiana Intercollegiate Conference (LIC) during the 1942 college football season. Led by ninth-year head coach Harry Turpin, the Demons compiled an overall record of 6–2 with mark of 3–0 in LIC play, and finished as LIC champion.

Louisiana Normal was ranked at No. 150 (out of 590 college and military teams) in the final rankings under the Litkenhous Difference by Score System for 1942.

Schedule

Date	Opponent	Site	Result	Source
September 19	at LSU*	Tiger Stadium; Baton Rouge, LA	L 0–40	
September 26	East Texas State*	Demon Stadium; Natchitoches, LA	W 13–0	
October 2	Sam Houston State*	Demon Stadium; Natchitoches, LA	W 27–6	
October 8	Camp Beauregard*	Demon Stadium; Natchitoches, LA	W 68–0	
October 24	vs. Louisiana Tech	State Fair Stadium; Shreveport, LA (rivalry)	W 10–6	
October 30	Southeastern Louisiana	Demon Stadium; Natchitoches, LA (rivalry)	W 7–6	
November 6	at Southwestern Louisiana	McNaspy Stadium; Lafayette, LA	W 11–6	
November 13	at Ouachita Baptist*	Arkadelphia, AR	L 0–6	
*Non-conference game

== 1943 ==
Due to the impacts of World War II, the 1943 season was canceled.

== 1944 ==
1944 Louisiana Normal Demons football
- Conference: Louisiana Intercollegiate Conference
- Record: 2–4–1 (0–3–1 LIC)
- Head coach: Harry Turpin (10th season)
- Home stadium: Demon Stadium

The 1944 Louisiana Normal Demons football team was an American football team that represented the Louisiana State Normal School (now known as Northwestern State University) as a member of the Louisiana Intercollegiate Conference (LIC) during the 1944 college football season. Led by 10th-year head coach Harry Turpin, the Demons compiled an overall record of 2–4–1 with mark of 0–3–1 in LIC play.

Schedule

Date	Time	Opponent	Site	Result	Source
September 23		at Transportation Corps Marine Officers' School*	City Park Stadium; New Orleans, LA	W 20–7	
September 30		Camp Polk*	Demon Stadium; Natchitoches, LA	W 14–0	
October 7		Selman Field*	Demon Stadium; Natchitoches, LA	L 7–20	
October 21		at Southwestern Louisiana	McNaspy Stadium; Lafayette, LA	L 7–19	
October 28		Louisiana Tech	Demon Field; Natchitoches, LA (rivalry)	L 7–21	
November 11		at Louisiana Tech	Tech Stadium; Ruston, LA (rivalry)	T 0–0	
November 18	8:15 p.m.	at Selman Field*	Brown Stadium; Monroe, LA	cancelled	
November 25		Southwestern Louisiana	Demon Stadium; Natchitoches, LA	L 6–7	
*Non-conference game; All times are in Central time

== 1945 ==
1945 Northwestern State Demons football
- Conference: Louisiana Intercollegiate Conference
- Record: 2–6–1 (1–2–1 LIC)
- Head coach: Harry Turpin (11th season)
- Home stadium: Demon Stadium

The 1945 Northwestern State Demons football team was an American football team that represented Northwestern State College of Louisiana (now known as Northwestern State University) as a member of the Louisiana Intercollegiate Conference (LIC) during the 1945 college football season. Led by 11th-year head coach Harry Turpin, the Demons compiled an overall record of 2–6–1 with mark of 1–2–1 in LIC play.

Northwestern State was ranked 187th among the nation's college and service teams in the final Litkenhous Ratings.

Schedule

Date	Time	Opponent	Site	Result	Attendance	Source
September 22	8:30 p.m.	Selman Field*	Demon Stadium; Natchitoches, LA	L 0–12		
September 29		at Lake Charles AAF*	Lake Charles, LA	W 7–0		
October 6	8:00 p.m.	at Barksdale Field*	State Fair Stadium; Shreveport, LA	L 6–19	6,000	
October 20		Southwestern Louisiana	Demon Stadium; Natchitoches, LA	T 0–0		
October 27		at Louisiana Tech	Tech Stadium; Ruston, LA (rivalry)	L 7–18		
November 2		at Selman Field*	Monroe, LA	L 0–13		
November 10		Louisiana Tech	Demon Field; Natchitoches, LA (rivalry)	L 2–7		
November 17		at No. 16 Mississippi State*	Scott Field; Starkville, MS	L 0–54	2,200	
November 22		at Southwestern Louisiana	McNaspy Stadium; Lafayette, LA	W 13–0		
*Non-conference game; Rankings from AP Poll released prior to the game; All times are in Central time

== 1946 ==
1946 Northwestern State Demons football
- Conference: Louisiana Intercollegiate Conference
- Record: 4–6 (1–3 LIC)
- Head coach: Harry Turpin (12th season)
- Home stadium: Demon Stadium

1946 Louisiana Intercollegiate Conference football standings
	Conf.					Overall
Team	W		L		T	W		L		T
Southeastern Louisiana $	4	–	0	–	0	9	–	0	–	0
Louisiana Tech	3	–	1	–	0	7	–	3	–	0
Southwestern Louisiana	2	–	2	–	0	6	–	4	–	0
Northwestern State	1	–	3	–	0	4	–	6	–	0
Louisiana College	0	–	4	–	0	1	–	8	–	0
$ – Conference champion

The 1946 Northwestern State Demons football team represented Northwestern State College of Louisiana (now known as Northwestern State University) as a member of the Louisiana Intercollegiate Conference (LIC) during the 1946 college football season. In their 12th season under head coach Harry Turpin, the team compiled a 4–6 record with mark of 1–3 in LIC play.

Schedule

Date	Opponent	Site	Result	Attendance	Source
September 21	at Arkansas*	Razorback Stadium; Fayetteville, AR	L 14–21	9,000	
September 28	at East Texas State*	Lion Stadium; Commerce, TX	L 0–32	3,500	
October 12	at Louisiana College	Alumni Field; Pineville, LA	W 40–0		
October 18	at Southeastern Louisiana	Strawberry Stadium; Hammond, LA (rivalry)	L 0–13		
October 26	vs. Louisiana Tech	State Fair Stadium; Shreveport, LA (rivalry)	L 7–14		
November 1	Ouachita Baptist*	Demon Stadium; Natchitoches, LA	W 47–14		
November 8	Mississippi Southern*	Demon Stadium; Natchitoches, LA	W 7–6	3,000	
November 16	at Mississippi State*	Scott Field; Starkville, MS	L 0–27	5,000	
November 23	Southwestern Louisiana^{†}	Demon Stadium; Natchitoches, LA	L 0–14	5,000	
November 29	at Stephen F. Austin*	Demon Stadium; Natchitoches, LA (rivalry)	W 27–6	1,200	
*Non-conference game; ^{†}Homecoming

== 1947 ==
1947 Northwestern State Demons football
- Conference: Louisiana Intercollegiate Conference
- Record: 4–5 (3–2 LIC)
- Head coach: Harry Turpin (13th season)
- Home stadium: Demon Stadium

1947 Louisiana Intercollegiate Conference football standings
	Conf.					Overall
Team	W		L		T	W		L		T
Louisiana Tech $	5	–	0	–	0	5	–	4	–	0
Southwestern Louisiana	4	–	1	–	0	6	–	2	–	0
Northwestern State	3	–	2	–	0	4	–	5	–	0
Southeastern Louisiana	2	–	3	–	0	3	–	5	–	1
Centenary	1	–	4	–	0	1	–	9	–	1
Louisiana College	0	–	4	–	0	1	–	5	–	1
$ – Conference champion

The 1947 Northwestern State Demons football team represented Northwestern State College of Louisiana (now known as Northwestern State University) as a member of the Louisiana Intercollegiate Conference (LIC) during the 1947 college football season. In their 13th season under head coach Harry Turpin, the team compiled a 4–5 record with mark of 3–2 in LIC play.

Northwestern State was ranked at No. 246 (out of 500 college football teams) in the final Litkenhous Ratings for 1947.

Schedule

Date	Opponent	Site	Result	Attendance	Source
September 20	at Arkansas*	Razorback Stadium; Fayetteville, AR	L 0–64		
September 26	East Texas State*	Demon Stadium; Natchitoches, LA	L 0–27		
October 10	Louisiana College	Demon Stadium; Natchitoches, LA	W 47–7		
October 17	Southeastern Louisiana	Demon Stadium; Natchitoches, LA (rivalry)	W 14–12		
October 25	vs. Louisiana Tech	State Fair Stadium; Shreveport, LA (rivalry)	L 0–24	10,000	
November 1	at Ouachita Baptist*	Arkadelphia, AR	W 20–2		
November 7	at Mississippi Southern*	Faulkner Field; Hattiesburg, MS	L 0–20		
November 15	Centenary	Demon Stadium; Natchitoches, LA	W 22–7		
November 27	at Southwestern Louisiana	McNaspy Stadium; Lafayette, LA	L 7–9		
*Non-conference game

== 1948 ==
1948 Northwestern State Demons football
- Conference: Gulf States Conference
- Record: 5–3–1 (2–3 GSC)
- Head coach: Harry Turpin (14th season)
- Home stadium: Demon Stadium

1948 Gulf States Conference football standings
	Conf.					Overall
Team	W		L		T	W		L		T
Mississippi Southern $	4	–	0	–	0	7	–	3	–	0
Louisiana Tech	4	–	1	–	0	7	–	2	–	1
Southwestern Louisiana	3	–	2	–	0	6	–	3	–	1
Northwestern State	2	–	3	–	0	5	–	3	–	1
Louisiana College	1	–	3	–	0	2	–	8	–	0
Southeastern Louisiana	0	–	5	–	0	3	–	6	–	1
$ – Conference champion

The 1948 Northwestern State Demons football team was an American football team that represented Northwestern State College of Louisiana (now known as Northwestern State University) as a member of the Gulf States Conference (GSC) during the 1948 college football season. In their 14th year under head coach Harry Turpin, the team compiled an overall record of 5–3–1 with a mark of 2–3 in conference play, and finished fourth in the GSC. Northwestern State played their home games on campus at Demon Stadium in Natchitoches, Louisiana.

Northwestern State was ranked at No. 233 in the final Litkenhous Difference by Score System ratings for 1948.

Schedule

Date	Opponent	Site	Result	Attendance	Source
September 18	Barksdale Field*	Demon Stadium; Natchitoches, LA	W 52–0	4,500	
September 25	Central State (OK)*	Demon Stadium; Natchitoches, LA	W 26–12	4,500	
October 1	at Wofford*	Synder Field; Spartanburg, SC	T 0–0		
October 9	vs. Louisiana College	Bolton Stadium; Alexandria, LA	W 13–0		
October 15	at Southeastern Louisiana	Strawberry Stadium; Hammond, LA (rivalry)	W 49–0		
October 23	vs. Louisiana Tech	State Fair Stadium; Shreveport, LA (rivalry)	L 7–10	12,000	
October 30	Mississippi Southern	Demon Stadium; Natchitoches, LA	L 14–38	5,000	
November 13	Arkansas State*	Demon Stadium; Natchitoches, LA	W 41–6		
November 20	Southwestern Louisiana^{†}	Demon Stadium; Natchitoches, LA	L 7–28	5,500	
*Non-conference game; ^{†}Homecoming

== 1949 ==
1949 Northwestern State Demons football
- Conference: Gulf States Conference
- Record: 5–4 (1–4 GSC)
- Head coach: Harry Turpin (15th season)
- Home stadium: Demon Stadium

1949 Gulf States Conference football standings
	Conf.					Overall
Team	W		L		T	W		L		T
Louisiana Tech $	5	–	0	–	0	7	–	2	–	0
Mississippi Southern	2	–	1	–	0	7	–	3	–	0
Southwestern Louisiana	3	–	2	–	0	6	–	3	–	0
Southeastern Louisiana	1	–	2	–	1	4	–	5	–	1
Northwestern State	1	–	4	–	0	5	–	4	–	0
Louisiana College	0	–	3	–	1	4	–	6	–	1
$ – Conference champion

The 1949 Northwestern State Demons football team represented Northwestern State College of Louisiana—now known as Northwestern State University—as a member of the Gulf States Conference during the 1949 college football season. Led by 15th-year head coach Harry Turpin, the Demons compiled an overall record of 5–4 record with a mark of 1–4 in conference play, placing fifth in the GSC.

Schedule

Date	Time	Opponent	Site	Result	Attendance	Source
September 24		Central State (OK)*	Demon Stadium; Natchitoches, LA	W 7–6		
September 30	8:00 p.m.	at Maryville (MO)*	College Field; Maryville, MO	W 31–14		
October 8	8:15 p.m.	vs. Louisiana College	Bolton Stadium; Alexandria, LA	W 7–6		
October 15		Southeastern Louisiana^{†}	Demon Stadium; Natchitoches, LA (rivalry)	L 13–25		
October 22	2:30 p.m.	vs. Louisiana Tech	State Fair Stadium; Shreveport, LA (rivalry)	L 21–28		
October 29	8:00 p.m.	at Mississippi Southern	Faulkner Field; Hattiesburg, MS	L 28–67	9,000	
November 5	8:00 p.m.	Union (TN)*	Demon Stadium; Natchitoches, LA	W 31–14		
November 19		at Southwestern Louisiana	McNaspy Stadium; Lafayette, LA	L 14–27		
November 24	2:00 p.m.	at East Texas Baptist*	Maverick Stadium; Marshall, TX	W 19–13	1,000	
*Non-conference game; ^{†}Homecoming; All times are in Central time
