= 1940 Morehead State Eagles football team =

American college football season

1940 Morehead State Eagles football
- Conference: Kentucky Intercollegiate Athletic Conference, Southern Intercollegiate Athletic Association
- Record: 3–2–2 (1–1–2 KIAC, 1–1–2 SIAA)
- Head coach: Ellis T. Johnson (5th season)

1940 Kentucky Intercollegiate Athletic Conference football standings
| | Conf. | | | | | Overall |
| Team | W | | L | | T | W | | L | | T |
|---|---|---|---|---|---|---|---|---|---|---|
| Centre $ | 2 | – | 0 | – | 0 | 3 | – | 6 | – | 0 |
| Eastern Kentucky | 1 | – | 0 | – | 0 | 8 | – | 0 | – | 0 |
| Western Kentucky State Teachers | 1 | – | 0 | – | 1 | 7 | – | 1 | – | 1 |
| Georgetown (KY) | 2 | – | 1 | – | 0 | 5 | – | 3 | – | 2 |
| Transylvania | 1 | – | 2 | – | 1 | 5 | – | 3 | – | 1 |
| Morehead State | 1 | – | 1 | – | 2 | 3 | – | 2 | – | 2 |
| Union (KY) | 0 | – | 1 | – | 1 | 5 | – | 1 | – | 1 |
| Murray State | 0 | – | 1 | – | 1 | 4 | – | 3 | – | 2 |
| Louisville | 0 | – | 2 | – | 0 | 3 | – | 5 | – | 1 |
$ – Conference champion

1940 Southern Intercollegiate Athletic Association football standings
| | Conf. | | | | | Overall |
| Team | W | | L | | T | W | | L | | T |
|---|---|---|---|---|---|---|---|---|---|---|
| Rollins $ | 6 | – | 0 | – | 0 | 8 | – | 1 | – | 0 |
| Newberry | 4 | – | 0 | – | 0 | 7 | – | 2 | – | 1 |
| Mississippi College | 2 | – | 0 | – | 0 | 5 | – | 1 | – | 1 |
| Eastern Kentucky | 1 | – | 0 | – | 0 | 8 | – | 0 | – | 0 |
| Western Kentucky State Teachers | 4 | – | 1 | – | 1 | 7 | – | 1 | – | 1 |
| Louisiana Normal | 4 | – | 1 | – | 1 | 6 | – | 3 | – | 1 |
| SW Louisiana | 4 | – | 1 | – | 0 | 6 | – | 3 | – | 1 |
| Union (TN) | 3 | – | 1 | – | 0 | 6 | – | 3 | – | 0 |
| Georgetown (KY) | 2 | – | 1 | – | 0 | 5 | – | 3 | – | 2 |
| Murray State | 4 | – | 2 | – | 1 | 4 | – | 3 | – | 2 |
| Centre | 2 | – | 1 | – | 0 | 3 | – | 6 | – | 0 |
| Miami (FL) | 2 | – | 1 | – | 0 | 3 | – | 7 | – | 0 |
| Presbyterian | 5 | – | 3 | – | 0 | 6 | – | 4 | – | 0 |
| Mississippi Southern | 3 | – | 2 | – | 0 | 7 | – | 4 | – | 0 |
| Louisiana Tech | 3 | – | 2 | – | 0 | 6 | – | 4 | – | 0 |
| West Tennessee State Teachers | 4 | – | 3 | – | 0 | 5 | – | 5 | – | 0 |
| Morehead State | 1 | – | 1 | – | 2 | 3 | – | 3 | – | 2 |
| Wofford | 2 | – | 2 | – | 1 | 3 | – | 4 | – | 2 |
| Middle Tennessee State Teachers | 2 | – | 4 | – | 0 | 4 | – | 4 | – | 0 |
| Tampa | 2 | – | 4 | – | 0 | 3 | – | 6 | – | 0 |
| Oglethorpe | 2 | – | 4 | – | 0 | 2 | – | 6 | – | 0 |
| Tennessee Tech | 1 | – | 2 | – | 0 | 2 | – | 6 | – | 0 |
| Transylvania | 1 | – | 2 | – | 1 | 5 | – | 3 | – | 1 |
| Stetson | 2 | – | 5 | – | 1 | 2 | – | 5 | – | 1 |
| Troy State | 1 | – | 3 | – | 0 | 3 | – | 6 | – | 0 |
| Louisiana College | 1 | – | 4 | – | 2 | 2 | – | 5 | – | 2 |
| Union (KY) | 0 | – | 1 | – | 1 | 5 | – | 1 | – | 1 |
| Centenary | 0 | – | 2 | – | 0 | 3 | – | 7 | – | 0 |
| Louisville | 0 | – | 2 | – | 0 | 3 | – | 5 | – | 1 |
| Jacksonville State | 0 | – | 2 | – | 0 | 3 | – | 5 | – | 0 |
| Erskine | 0 | – | 5 | – | 0 | 1 | – | 8 | – | 0 |
| Delta State | 0 | – | 5 | – | 1 | 0 | – | 8 | – | 2 |
$ – Conference champion

The 1940 Morehead State Eagles football team represented Morehead State Teachers College—now known as Morehead State University—as a member of the Kentucky Intercollegiate Athletic Conference (KIAC) and the Southern Intercollegiate Athletic Association (SIAA) during the 1940 college football season. Led by fifth-year head coach Ellis T. Johnson, the Eagles compiled an overall record of 3–2–2 with a mark of 1–1–2 in both KIAC and SIAA play.

== Schedule ==
| Date | Opponent | Site | Result | Attendance | Source |
|---|---|---|---|---|---|
| September 21 | at Marshall* | Fairfield Stadium; Huntington, WV | L 6–13 | 6,000 | |
| October 5 | vs. Murray State | Ashland, KY | T 0–0 | | |
| October 12 | Alfred Holbrook* | Morehead, KY | W 45–0 | | |
| October 18 | Salem* | Morehead, KY | W 27–0 | | |
| October 26 | at Eastern Kentucky | Hanger Stadium; Richmond, KY (Old Hawg Rifle) | L 13–27 | 3,500 | |
| November 9 | at Western Kentucky State Teachers | Morehead, KY | T 0–0 | 2,500 | |
| November 16 | Transylvania^{†} | Morehead, KY | W 6–0 | 2,000 | |
*Non-conference game; ^{†}Homecoming
