= 1940 Jacksonville State Eagle Owls football team =

American college football season

1940 Jacksonville State Eagle Owls football
- Conference: Alabama Intercollegiate Conference, Southern Intercollegiate Athletic Association
- Record: 3–5 (2–3 AIC, 0–2 SIAA)
- Head coach: Osmo Smith (1st season)
- Home stadium: College Field

1940 Southern Intercollegiate Athletic Association football standings
	Conf.					Overall
Team	W		L		T	W		L		T
Rollins $	6	–	0	–	0	8	–	1	–	0
Newberry	4	–	0	–	0	7	–	2	–	1
Mississippi College	2	–	0	–	0	5	–	1	–	1
Eastern Kentucky	1	–	0	–	0	8	–	0	–	0
Western Kentucky State Teachers	4	–	1	–	1	7	–	1	–	1
Louisiana Normal	4	–	1	–	1	6	–	3	–	1
SW Louisiana	4	–	1	–	0	6	–	3	–	1
Union (TN)	3	–	1	–	0	6	–	3	–	0
Georgetown (KY)	2	–	1	–	0	5	–	3	–	2
Murray State	4	–	2	–	1	4	–	3	–	2
Centre	2	–	1	–	0	3	–	6	–	0
Miami (FL)	2	–	1	–	0	3	–	7	–	0
Presbyterian	5	–	3	–	0	6	–	4	–	0
Mississippi Southern	3	–	2	–	0	7	–	4	–	0
Louisiana Tech	3	–	2	–	0	6	–	4	–	0
West Tennessee State Teachers	4	–	3	–	0	5	–	5	–	0
Morehead State	1	–	1	–	2	3	–	3	–	2
Wofford	2	–	2	–	1	3	–	4	–	2
Middle Tennessee State Teachers	2	–	4	–	0	4	–	4	–	0
Tampa	2	–	4	–	0	3	–	6	–	0
Oglethorpe	2	–	4	–	0	2	–	6	–	0
Tennessee Tech	1	–	2	–	0	2	–	6	–	0
Transylvania	1	–	2	–	1	5	–	3	–	1
Stetson	2	–	5	–	1	2	–	5	–	1
Troy State	1	–	3	–	0	3	–	6	–	0
Louisiana College	1	–	4	–	2	2	–	5	–	2
Union (KY)	0	–	1	–	1	5	–	1	–	1
Centenary	0	–	2	–	0	3	–	7	–	0
Louisville	0	–	2	–	0	3	–	5	–	1
Jacksonville State	0	–	2	–	0	3	–	5	–	0
Erskine	0	–	5	–	0	1	–	8	–	0
Delta State	0	–	5	–	1	0	–	8	–	2
$ – Conference champion

The 1940 Jacksonville State Eagle Owls football team represented Jacksonville State Teachers College (now known as Jacksonville State University) as a member of the Alabama Intercollegiate Conference (AIC) and the Southern Intercollegiate Athletic Association (SIAA) during the 1940 college football season. Led by first-year head coach Osmo Smith, the Eagle Owls compiled an overall record of 3–5 with a marks 2–3 in AIC play and 0–2 against SIAA opponents.

== Schedule ==
Date	Opponent	Site	Result	Attendance	Source
September 27	at Middle Tennessee State	Horace Jones Field; Murfreesboro, TN	L 7–46	2,500	
October 5	Hiwassee*	Memorial Stadium; Anniston, AL	W 26–6		
October 11	at Marion	Johnson Field; Marion, AL	L 2–6		
October 18	at Gordon Military College*	Barnesville, GA	L 0–19		
November 2	at Livingston State	McConnell Field; Livingston, AL	L 2–13		
October 26	Snead^{†}	College Field; Jacksonville, AL	W 40–0		
November 8	at Troy State	Pace Field; Troy, AL (rivalry)	L 0–7		
November 15	at St. Bernard	Cullman, AL	W 35–7		
*Non-conference game; ^{†}Homecoming
