= 1940 West Tennessee State Teachers Tigers football team =

American college football season

1940 West Tennessee State Teachers Tigers football
- Conference: Southern Intercollegiate Athletic Association
- Record: 5–5 (4–3 SIAA)
- Head coach: Cecil C. Humphreys (2nd season)
- Captains: Jerry Burns; Hank Farino
- Home stadium: Crump Stadium, Fairgrounds Stadium

1940 Southern Intercollegiate Athletic Association football standings
| | Conf. | | | | | Overall |
| Team | W | | L | | T | W | | L | | T |
|---|---|---|---|---|---|---|---|---|---|---|
| Rollins $ | 6 | – | 0 | – | 0 | 8 | – | 1 | – | 0 |
| Newberry | 4 | – | 0 | – | 0 | 7 | – | 2 | – | 1 |
| Mississippi College | 2 | – | 0 | – | 0 | 5 | – | 1 | – | 1 |
| Eastern Kentucky | 1 | – | 0 | – | 0 | 8 | – | 0 | – | 0 |
| Western Kentucky State Teachers | 4 | – | 1 | – | 1 | 7 | – | 1 | – | 1 |
| Louisiana Normal | 4 | – | 1 | – | 1 | 6 | – | 3 | – | 1 |
| SW Louisiana | 4 | – | 1 | – | 0 | 6 | – | 3 | – | 1 |
| Union (TN) | 3 | – | 1 | – | 0 | 6 | – | 3 | – | 0 |
| Georgetown (KY) | 2 | – | 1 | – | 0 | 5 | – | 3 | – | 2 |
| Murray State | 4 | – | 2 | – | 1 | 4 | – | 3 | – | 2 |
| Centre | 2 | – | 1 | – | 0 | 3 | – | 6 | – | 0 |
| Miami (FL) | 2 | – | 1 | – | 0 | 3 | – | 7 | – | 0 |
| Presbyterian | 5 | – | 3 | – | 0 | 6 | – | 4 | – | 0 |
| Mississippi Southern | 3 | – | 2 | – | 0 | 7 | – | 4 | – | 0 |
| Louisiana Tech | 3 | – | 2 | – | 0 | 6 | – | 4 | – | 0 |
| West Tennessee State Teachers | 4 | – | 3 | – | 0 | 5 | – | 5 | – | 0 |
| Morehead State | 1 | – | 1 | – | 2 | 3 | – | 3 | – | 2 |
| Wofford | 2 | – | 2 | – | 1 | 3 | – | 4 | – | 2 |
| Middle Tennessee State Teachers | 2 | – | 4 | – | 0 | 4 | – | 4 | – | 0 |
| Tampa | 2 | – | 4 | – | 0 | 3 | – | 6 | – | 0 |
| Oglethorpe | 2 | – | 4 | – | 0 | 2 | – | 6 | – | 0 |
| Tennessee Tech | 1 | – | 2 | – | 0 | 2 | – | 6 | – | 0 |
| Transylvania | 1 | – | 2 | – | 1 | 5 | – | 3 | – | 1 |
| Stetson | 2 | – | 5 | – | 1 | 2 | – | 5 | – | 1 |
| Troy State | 1 | – | 3 | – | 0 | 3 | – | 6 | – | 0 |
| Louisiana College | 1 | – | 4 | – | 2 | 2 | – | 5 | – | 2 |
| Union (KY) | 0 | – | 1 | – | 1 | 5 | – | 1 | – | 1 |
| Centenary | 0 | – | 2 | – | 0 | 3 | – | 7 | – | 0 |
| Louisville | 0 | – | 2 | – | 0 | 3 | – | 5 | – | 1 |
| Jacksonville State | 0 | – | 2 | – | 0 | 3 | – | 5 | – | 0 |
| Erskine | 0 | – | 5 | – | 0 | 1 | – | 8 | – | 0 |
| Delta State | 0 | – | 5 | – | 1 | 0 | – | 8 | – | 2 |
$ – Conference champion

The 1940 West Tennessee State Teachers Tigers football team was an American football team that represented the West Tennessee State Teachers College (now known as the University of Memphis), as a member of the Southern Intercollegiate Athletic Association during the 1940 college football season. In their second season under head coach Cecil C. Humphreys, West Tennessee State Teachers compiled a 5–5 record.

West Tennessee was ranked at No. 285 (out of 697 college football teams) in the final rankings under the Litkenhous Difference by Score system for 1940.

== Schedule ==
| Date | Time | Opponent | Site | Result | Attendance | Source |
|---|---|---|---|---|---|---|
| September 21 | | Austin Peay* | Crump Stadium; Memphis, TN | W 40–0 | | |
| September 28 | | Southwestern (TN)* | Crump Stadium; Memphis, TN | L 0–34 | 7,000 | |
| October 4 | | at Tennessee Tech | Cookeville, TN | L 13–16 | | |
| October 12 | | Middle Tennessee State Teachers | Crump Stadium; Memphis, TN | W 14–7 | 2,000 | |
| October 19 | | Louisiana College | Crump Stadium; Memphis, TN | W 26–13 | | |
| October 26 | | at Delta State | Delta Field; Cleveland, MS | W 7–0 | | |
| November 1 | | at Troy State | Cramton Bowl; Montgomery, AL | W 31–7 | | |
| November 9 | | at Murray State | Murray, KY | L 6–35 | 4,500 | |
| November 16 | | at No. 17 Ole Miss* | Hemingway Stadium; Oxford, MS (rivalry) | L 7–38 | | |
| November 26 | 8:00 p.m. | Union (TN) | Fairgrounds Stadium; Memphis, TN | L 6–22 | | |
*Non-conference game; Rankings from AP Poll released prior to the game; All times are in Central time
