= Osmo Smith =

American football player and coach (1912–1949)

Biographical details
- Born: January 28, 1912; Lee County, Alabama, U.S.
- Died: July 6, 1949 (aged 37); Auburn, Alabama, U.S.

Playing career
- 1936–1938: Auburn
- Position: Quarterback

Coaching career (HC unless noted)
- 1939: Selma HS (AL) (assistant)
- 1940: Jacksonville State

Head coaching record
- Overall: 3–5

Osmo C. Smith (January 28, 1912 – July 6, 1949) was an American football player and coach. He served as the head football coach at Jacksonville State University–then known as Jacksonville State Teachers College–in 1940. Smith was a three-time letter winner at Auburn University from 1936 to 1938.

Smith died of a heart attack, on July 6, 1949, at his home in Auburn, Alabama.

== Head coaching record ==
Year	Team	Overall	Conference	Standing	Bowl/playoffs
Jacksonville State Eagle Owls (Alabama Intercollegiate Conference / Southern Intercollegiate Athletic Association) (1940)
1940	Jacksonville State	3–5	2–3 / 0–2	/ T-28th	
Jacksonville State:		3–5	2–4		
Total:		3–5			
