= 1940 Mississippi Southern Southerners football team =

American college football season

1940 Mississippi Southern Southerners football
- Conference: Southern Intercollegiate Athletic Association
- Record: 7–4 (3–2 SIAA)
- Head coach: Reed Green (4th season)
- Home stadium: Faulkner Field

1940 Southern Intercollegiate Athletic Association football standings
	Conf.					Overall
Team	W		L		T	W		L		T
Rollins $	6	–	0	–	0	8	–	1	–	0
Newberry	4	–	0	–	0	7	–	2	–	1
Mississippi College	2	–	0	–	0	5	–	1	–	1
Eastern Kentucky	1	–	0	–	0	8	–	0	–	0
Western Kentucky State Teachers	4	–	1	–	1	7	–	1	–	1
Louisiana Normal	4	–	1	–	1	6	–	3	–	1
SW Louisiana	4	–	1	–	0	6	–	3	–	1
Union (TN)	3	–	1	–	0	6	–	3	–	0
Georgetown (KY)	2	–	1	–	0	5	–	3	–	2
Murray State	4	–	2	–	1	4	–	3	–	2
Centre	2	–	1	–	0	3	–	6	–	0
Miami (FL)	2	–	1	–	0	3	–	7	–	0
Presbyterian	5	–	3	–	0	6	–	4	–	0
Mississippi Southern	3	–	2	–	0	7	–	4	–	0
Louisiana Tech	3	–	2	–	0	6	–	4	–	0
West Tennessee State Teachers	4	–	3	–	0	5	–	5	–	0
Morehead State	1	–	1	–	2	3	–	3	–	2
Wofford	2	–	2	–	1	3	–	4	–	2
Middle Tennessee State Teachers	2	–	4	–	0	4	–	4	–	0
Tampa	2	–	4	–	0	3	–	6	–	0
Oglethorpe	2	–	4	–	0	2	–	6	–	0
Tennessee Tech	1	–	2	–	0	2	–	6	–	0
Transylvania	1	–	2	–	1	5	–	3	–	1
Stetson	2	–	5	–	1	2	–	5	–	1
Troy State	1	–	3	–	0	3	–	6	–	0
Louisiana College	1	–	4	–	2	2	–	5	–	2
Union (KY)	0	–	1	–	1	5	–	1	–	1
Centenary	0	–	2	–	0	3	–	7	–	0
Louisville	0	–	2	–	0	3	–	5	–	1
Jacksonville State	0	–	2	–	0	3	–	5	–	0
Erskine	0	–	5	–	0	1	–	8	–	0
Delta State	0	–	5	–	1	0	–	8	–	2
$ – Conference champion

The 1940 Mississippi Southern Southerners football team was an American football team that represented Mississippi Southern College (now known as the University of Southern Mississippi) as a member of the Southern Intercollegiate Athletic Association during the 1940 college football season. In their fourth year under head coach Reed Green, the team compiled a 7–4 record.

Mississippi Southern was ranked at No. 164 (out of 697 college football teams) in the final rankings under the Litkenhous Difference by Score system for 1940.

== Schedule ==
Date	Opponent	Site	Result	Source
September 27	Troy State	Faulkner Field; Hattiesburg, MS	W 25–0	
October 4	Sam Houston State*	Faulkner Field; Hattiesburg, MS	L 16–18	
October 11	at Southeastern Louisiana*	Strawberry Stadium; Hammond, LA	W 13–6	
October 19	at Millsaps*	Jackson, MS	L 7–14	
October 26	Spring Hill*^{†}	Faulkner Field; Hattiesburg, MS	W 38–6	
November 2	at Louisiana College	Alumni Field; Pineville, LA	L 0–7	
November 9	at Louisiana Normal	Demon Stadium; Natchitoches, LA	L 6–9	
November 15	Southwestern Louisiana	Faulkner Field; Hattiesburg, MS	W 21–14	
November 22	Delta State	Faulkner Field; Hattiesburg, MS	W 41–0	
December 5	at St. Mary's (TX)*	Senior H.S. Stadium; Corpus Christi, TX	W 27–6	
December 14	37th Infantry Division (OH)*	Faulkner Field; Hattiesburg, MS	W 26–0	
*Non-conference game; ^{†}Homecoming
