= 1940 Union (Kentucky) Bulldogs football team =

American college football season

1940 Union (Kentucky) Bulldogs football
- Conference: Kentucky Intercollegiate Athletic Conference, Southern Intercollegiate Athletic Association
- Record: 5–1–1 (0–1–1 KIAC, 0–1–1 SIAA)
- Head coach: J. Richard Bacon (12th season)
- Home stadium: Union field

1940 Kentucky Intercollegiate Athletic Conference football standings
	Conf.					Overall
Team	W		L		T	W		L		T
Centre $	2	–	0	–	0	3	–	6	–	0
Eastern Kentucky	1	–	0	–	0	8	–	0	–	0
Western Kentucky State Teachers	1	–	0	–	1	7	–	1	–	1
Georgetown (KY)	2	–	1	–	0	5	–	3	–	2
Transylvania	1	–	2	–	1	5	–	3	–	1
Morehead State	1	–	1	–	2	3	–	2	–	2
Union (KY)	0	–	1	–	1	5	–	1	–	1
Murray State	0	–	1	–	1	4	–	3	–	2
Louisville	0	–	2	–	0	3	–	5	–	1
$ – Conference champion

1940 Southern Intercollegiate Athletic Association football standings
	Conf.					Overall
Team	W		L		T	W		L		T
Rollins $	6	–	0	–	0	8	–	1	–	0
Newberry	4	–	0	–	0	7	–	2	–	1
Mississippi College	2	–	0	–	0	5	–	1	–	1
Eastern Kentucky	1	–	0	–	0	8	–	0	–	0
Western Kentucky State Teachers	4	–	1	–	1	7	–	1	–	1
Louisiana Normal	4	–	1	–	1	6	–	3	–	1
SW Louisiana	4	–	1	–	0	6	–	3	–	1
Union (TN)	3	–	1	–	0	6	–	3	–	0
Georgetown (KY)	2	–	1	–	0	5	–	3	–	2
Murray State	4	–	2	–	1	4	–	3	–	2
Centre	2	–	1	–	0	3	–	6	–	0
Miami (FL)	2	–	1	–	0	3	–	7	–	0
Presbyterian	5	–	3	–	0	6	–	4	–	0
Mississippi Southern	3	–	2	–	0	7	–	4	–	0
Louisiana Tech	3	–	2	–	0	6	–	4	–	0
West Tennessee State Teachers	4	–	3	–	0	5	–	5	–	0
Morehead State	1	–	1	–	2	3	–	3	–	2
Wofford	2	–	2	–	1	3	–	4	–	2
Middle Tennessee State Teachers	2	–	4	–	0	4	–	4	–	0
Tampa	2	–	4	–	0	3	–	6	–	0
Oglethorpe	2	–	4	–	0	2	–	6	–	0
Tennessee Tech	1	–	2	–	0	2	–	6	–	0
Transylvania	1	–	2	–	1	5	–	3	–	1
Stetson	2	–	5	–	1	2	–	5	–	1
Troy State	1	–	3	–	0	3	–	6	–	0
Louisiana College	1	–	4	–	2	2	–	5	–	2
Union (KY)	0	–	1	–	1	5	–	1	–	1
Centenary	0	–	2	–	0	3	–	7	–	0
Louisville	0	–	2	–	0	3	–	5	–	1
Jacksonville State	0	–	2	–	0	3	–	5	–	0
Erskine	0	–	5	–	0	1	–	8	–	0
Delta State	0	–	5	–	1	0	–	8	–	2
$ – Conference champion

The 1940 Union (Kentucky) Bulldogs football team represented Union College—now known as Union Commonwealth University—of Barbourville, Kentucky as a member the Kentucky Intercollegiate Athletic Conference (KIAC) and the Southern Intercollegiate Athletic Association (SIAA) during the 1940 college football season. Led by 12th-year head coach J. Richard Bacon, the Tigers compiled an overall record of 5–1–1 with a mark of 0–1–1 in both KIAC and SIAA play.

== Schedule ==
Date	Time	Opponent	Site	Result	Attendance	Source
September 21		Alfred Holbrook*	Barbourville, KY	W 14–0		
September 28		at Tusculum*	Greeneville, TN	W 15–6		
October 4	2:00 p.m.	Rio Grande*	Union field; Barbourville, KY	W 12–0		
October 18	8:00 p.m.	at Transylvania	Thomas Field; Lexington, KY	T 0–0	1,500	
October 26		Tusculum*	Barbourville, KY	W 19–7		
November 1	3:00 p.m.	at Hiwassee*	Callahan Field; Madisonville, TN	W 20–7		
November 8	2:00 p.m.	at Georgetown (KY)	Hinton Field; Georgetown, KY	L 7–27	1,500	
*Non-conference game; All times are in Eastern time
