= 1940 Newberry Indians football team =

American college football season

1940 Newberry Indians football
- Conference: Southern Intercollegiate Athletic Association
- Record: 7–2–1 (4–0 SIAA)
- Head coach: Billy Laval (3rd season)
- Home stadium: Setzler Field

1940 Southern Intercollegiate Athletic Association football standings
	Conf.					Overall
Team	W		L		T	W		L		T
Rollins $	6	–	0	–	0	8	–	1	–	0
Newberry	4	–	0	–	0	7	–	2	–	1
Mississippi College	2	–	0	–	0	5	–	1	–	1
Eastern Kentucky	1	–	0	–	0	8	–	0	–	0
Western Kentucky State Teachers	4	–	1	–	1	7	–	1	–	1
Louisiana Normal	4	–	1	–	1	6	–	3	–	1
SW Louisiana	4	–	1	–	0	6	–	3	–	1
Union (TN)	3	–	1	–	0	6	–	3	–	0
Georgetown (KY)	2	–	1	–	0	5	–	3	–	2
Murray State	4	–	2	–	1	4	–	3	–	2
Centre	2	–	1	–	0	3	–	6	–	0
Miami (FL)	2	–	1	–	0	3	–	7	–	0
Presbyterian	5	–	3	–	0	6	–	4	–	0
Mississippi Southern	3	–	2	–	0	7	–	4	–	0
Louisiana Tech	3	–	2	–	0	6	–	4	–	0
West Tennessee State Teachers	4	–	3	–	0	5	–	5	–	0
Morehead State	1	–	1	–	2	3	–	3	–	2
Wofford	2	–	2	–	1	3	–	4	–	2
Middle Tennessee State Teachers	2	–	4	–	0	4	–	4	–	0
Tampa	2	–	4	–	0	3	–	6	–	0
Oglethorpe	2	–	4	–	0	2	–	6	–	0
Tennessee Tech	1	–	2	–	0	2	–	6	–	0
Transylvania	1	–	2	–	1	5	–	3	–	1
Stetson	2	–	5	–	1	2	–	5	–	1
Troy State	1	–	3	–	0	3	–	6	–	0
Louisiana College	1	–	4	–	2	2	–	5	–	2
Union (KY)	0	–	1	–	1	5	–	1	–	1
Centenary	0	–	2	–	0	3	–	7	–	0
Louisville	0	–	2	–	0	3	–	5	–	1
Jacksonville State	0	–	2	–	0	3	–	5	–	0
Erskine	0	–	5	–	0	1	–	8	–	0
Delta State	0	–	5	–	1	0	–	8	–	2
$ – Conference champion

The 1940 Newberry Indians football team represented Newberry College as a member of the Southern Intercollegiate Athletic Association (SIAA) during the 1940 college football season. Led by third-year head coach Billy Laval, the Indians compiled an overall record of 7–2–1 with a mark of 4–0 in conference play, placing second in the SIAA. The team played home games at Setzler Field in Newberry, South Carolina.

== Schedule ==
Date	Time	Opponent	Site	Result	Attendance	Source
September 21	8:00 p.m.	Carson–Newman*	Setzler Field; Newberry, SC	W 26–0	2,000	
September 28	8:00 p.m.	Elon*	Setzler Field; Newberry, SC	T 6–6	1,500	
October 5		VMI*	Alumni Field; Lexington, VA	L 0–13	1,500	
October 11	8:00 p.m.	Presbyterian	Setzler Field; Newberry, SC	W 20–7	4,000	
October 19		at Appalachian State*	College Field; Boone, NC	L 7–9		
October 25	8:00 p.m.	Lenoir Rhyne*	Newberry, SC	W 36–0	2,500	
November 2	2:15 p.m.	at Oglethorpe	Hermance Stadium; North Atlanta, GA	W 28–7		
November 16	2:30 p.m.	at Erskine	Due West, SC	W 32–0	2,000	
November 21	2:30 p.m.	at Wofford	Snyder Field; Spartanburg, SC	W 46–6	4,000	
November 29	2:30 p.m.	High Point*	Setzler Field; Newberry, SC	W 48–0	1,500	
*Non-conference game; All times are in Eastern time
