= 1940 Wofford Terriers football team =

American college football season

1940 Wofford Terriers football
- Conference: Southern Intercollegiate Athletic Association
- Record: 3–4–2 (2–2–1 SIAA)
- Head coach: Jules Carson (7th` season)
- Home stadium: Snyder Field

1940 Southern Intercollegiate Athletic Association football standings
	Conf.					Overall
Team	W		L		T	W		L		T
Rollins $	6	–	0	–	0	8	–	1	–	0
Newberry	4	–	0	–	0	7	–	2	–	1
Mississippi College	2	–	0	–	0	5	–	1	–	1
Eastern Kentucky	1	–	0	–	0	8	–	0	–	0
Western Kentucky State Teachers	4	–	1	–	1	7	–	1	–	1
Louisiana Normal	4	–	1	–	1	6	–	3	–	1
SW Louisiana	4	–	1	–	0	6	–	3	–	1
Union (TN)	3	–	1	–	0	6	–	3	–	0
Georgetown (KY)	2	–	1	–	0	5	–	3	–	2
Murray State	4	–	2	–	1	4	–	3	–	2
Centre	2	–	1	–	0	3	–	6	–	0
Miami (FL)	2	–	1	–	0	3	–	7	–	0
Presbyterian	5	–	3	–	0	6	–	4	–	0
Mississippi Southern	3	–	2	–	0	7	–	4	–	0
Louisiana Tech	3	–	2	–	0	6	–	4	–	0
West Tennessee State Teachers	4	–	3	–	0	5	–	5	–	0
Morehead State	1	–	1	–	2	3	–	3	–	2
Wofford	2	–	2	–	1	3	–	4	–	2
Middle Tennessee State Teachers	2	–	4	–	0	4	–	4	–	0
Tampa	2	–	4	–	0	3	–	6	–	0
Oglethorpe	2	–	4	–	0	2	–	6	–	0
Tennessee Tech	1	–	2	–	0	2	–	6	–	0
Transylvania	1	–	2	–	1	5	–	3	–	1
Stetson	2	–	5	–	1	2	–	5	–	1
Troy State	1	–	3	–	0	3	–	6	–	0
Louisiana College	1	–	4	–	2	2	–	5	–	2
Union (KY)	0	–	1	–	1	5	–	1	–	1
Centenary	0	–	2	–	0	3	–	7	–	0
Louisville	0	–	2	–	0	3	–	5	–	1
Jacksonville State	0	–	2	–	0	3	–	5	–	0
Erskine	0	–	5	–	0	1	–	8	–	0
Delta State	0	–	5	–	1	0	–	8	–	2
$ – Conference champion

The 1940 Wofford Terriers football team represented Wofford College as a member of the Southern Intercollegiate Athletic Association (SIAA) during the 1940 college football season. Led by seventh-year head coach Jules Carson, the Terriers compiled an overall record of 3–4–2 with a mark of 2–2–1 in conference play, tying for 17th place in the SIAA.

== Schedule ==
Date	Time	Opponent	Site	Result	Attendance	Source
September 20	8:00 p.m.	at High Point*	High Point, NC	T 0–0	2,000	
September 28		at Clemson*	Riggs Field; Clemson, SC	L 0–26	4,000	
October 4		at Oglethorpe	Hermance Stadium; North Atlanta, GA	W 26–14		
October 12	2:00 p.m.	Erskine^{†}	Snyder Field; Spartanburg, SC	W 27–0	3,000	
October 25	10:30 a.m.	at Randolph–Macon*	Day Field; Ashland, VA	W 19–0	1,600	
November 1		vs. The Citadel*	County Fairgrounds; Orangeburg, SC (rivalry)	L 2–7	5,000	
November 9	2:30 p.m.	Stetson	Snyder Field; Spartanburg, SC	T 7–0		
November 16	2:30 p.m.	at Presbyterian	Old Bailey Stadium; Clinton, SC	L 6–12	2,200	
November 21	2:30 p.m.	Newberry	Snyder Field; Spartanburg, SC	L 6–46	4,000	
*Non-conference game; ^{†}Homecoming; All times are in Eastern time
