= 1940 Middle Tennessee State Teachers Blue Raiders football team =

American college football season

1940 Middle Tennessee State Teachers Blue Raiders football
- Conference: Southern Intercollegiate Athletic Association
- Record: 4–4 (2–4 SIAA)
- Head coach: Elwin W. Midgett (1st season)
- Captains: Elbert Patty; Tommy Hudson
- Home stadium: Horace Jones Field

1940 Southern Intercollegiate Athletic Association football standings
	Conf.					Overall
Team	W		L		T	W		L		T
Rollins $	6	–	0	–	0	8	–	1	–	0
Newberry	4	–	0	–	0	7	–	2	–	1
Mississippi College	2	–	0	–	0	5	–	1	–	1
Eastern Kentucky	1	–	0	–	0	8	–	0	–	0
Western Kentucky State Teachers	4	–	1	–	1	7	–	1	–	1
Louisiana Normal	4	–	1	–	1	6	–	3	–	1
SW Louisiana	4	–	1	–	0	6	–	3	–	1
Union (TN)	3	–	1	–	0	6	–	3	–	0
Georgetown (KY)	2	–	1	–	0	5	–	3	–	2
Murray State	4	–	2	–	1	4	–	3	–	2
Centre	2	–	1	–	0	3	–	6	–	0
Miami (FL)	2	–	1	–	0	3	–	7	–	0
Presbyterian	5	–	3	–	0	6	–	4	–	0
Mississippi Southern	3	–	2	–	0	7	–	4	–	0
Louisiana Tech	3	–	2	–	0	6	–	4	–	0
West Tennessee State Teachers	4	–	3	–	0	5	–	5	–	0
Morehead State	1	–	1	–	2	3	–	3	–	2
Wofford	2	–	2	–	1	3	–	4	–	2
Middle Tennessee State Teachers	2	–	4	–	0	4	–	4	–	0
Tampa	2	–	4	–	0	3	–	6	–	0
Oglethorpe	2	–	4	–	0	2	–	6	–	0
Tennessee Tech	1	–	2	–	0	2	–	6	–	0
Transylvania	1	–	2	–	1	5	–	3	–	1
Stetson	2	–	5	–	1	2	–	5	–	1
Troy State	1	–	3	–	0	3	–	6	–	0
Louisiana College	1	–	4	–	2	2	–	5	–	2
Union (KY)	0	–	1	–	1	5	–	1	–	1
Centenary	0	–	2	–	0	3	–	7	–	0
Louisville	0	–	2	–	0	3	–	5	–	1
Jacksonville State	0	–	2	–	0	3	–	5	–	0
Erskine	0	–	5	–	0	1	–	8	–	0
Delta State	0	–	5	–	1	0	–	8	–	2
$ – Conference champion

The 1940 Middle Tennessee State Teachers football team represented the Middle Tennessee State Teachers College (now known as Middle Tennessee State University) as a member of the Southern Intercollegiate Athletic Association (SIAA) during the 1940 college football season. Led by Elwin W. Midgett in his first season as head coach, Middle Tennessee State Teachers compiled an overall record of 4–4 with a mark of 2–4 in conference play. The team's captains were Elbert Patty and Tommy Hudson.

== Schedule ==
Date	Time	Opponent	Site	Result	Attendance	Source
September 27		Jacksonville State	Horace Jones Field; Murfreesboro, TN	W 46–7	2,500	
October 4		Austin Peay*	Horace Jones Field; Murfreesboro, TN	W 35–6		
October 12		at West Tennessee State Teachers	Crump Stadium; Memphis, TN	L 7–14		
October 19		Cumberland (TN)*	Horace Jones Field; Murfreesboro, TN	W 13–0		
October 26		at Western Kentucky State Teachers	Western Stadium; Bowling Green, KY (rivalry)	L 0–13		
November 7		at Union (TN)	Rothrock Field; Jackson, TN	L 0–20		
November 16	2:00 p.m.	Murray State	Horace Jones Field; Murfreesboro, TN	L 0–18		
November 28	2:00 p.m.	Tennessee Tech^{†}	Horace Jones Field; Murfreesboro, TN	W 6–0	3,000	
*Non-conference game; ^{†}Homecoming; All times are in Central time
