= 1940 Rollins Tars football team =

American college football season

1940 Rollins Tars football

SIAA champion
- Conference: Southern Intercollegiate Athletic Association
- Record: 8–1 (6–0 SIAA)
- Head coach: Jack McDowall (12th season)
- Home stadium: Orlando Stadium

1940 Southern Intercollegiate Athletic Association football standings
	Conf.					Overall
Team	W		L		T	W		L		T
Rollins $	6	–	0	–	0	8	–	1	–	0
Newberry	4	–	0	–	0	7	–	2	–	1
Mississippi College	2	–	0	–	0	5	–	1	–	1
Eastern Kentucky	1	–	0	–	0	8	–	0	–	0
Western Kentucky State Teachers	4	–	1	–	1	7	–	1	–	1
Louisiana Normal	4	–	1	–	1	6	–	3	–	1
SW Louisiana	4	–	1	–	0	6	–	3	–	1
Union (TN)	3	–	1	–	0	6	–	3	–	0
Georgetown (KY)	2	–	1	–	0	5	–	3	–	2
Murray State	4	–	2	–	1	4	–	3	–	2
Centre	2	–	1	–	0	3	–	6	–	0
Miami (FL)	2	–	1	–	0	3	–	7	–	0
Presbyterian	5	–	3	–	0	6	–	4	–	0
Mississippi Southern	3	–	2	–	0	7	–	4	–	0
Louisiana Tech	3	–	2	–	0	6	–	4	–	0
West Tennessee State Teachers	4	–	3	–	0	5	–	5	–	0
Morehead State	1	–	1	–	2	3	–	3	–	2
Wofford	2	–	2	–	1	3	–	4	–	2
Middle Tennessee State Teachers	2	–	4	–	0	4	–	4	–	0
Tampa	2	–	4	–	0	3	–	6	–	0
Oglethorpe	2	–	4	–	0	2	–	6	–	0
Tennessee Tech	1	–	2	–	0	2	–	6	–	0
Transylvania	1	–	2	–	1	5	–	3	–	1
Stetson	2	–	5	–	1	2	–	5	–	1
Troy State	1	–	3	–	0	3	–	6	–	0
Louisiana College	1	–	4	–	2	2	–	5	–	2
Union (KY)	0	–	1	–	1	5	–	1	–	1
Centenary	0	–	2	–	0	3	–	7	–	0
Louisville	0	–	2	–	0	3	–	5	–	1
Jacksonville State	0	–	2	–	0	3	–	5	–	0
Erskine	0	–	5	–	0	1	–	8	–	0
Delta State	0	–	5	–	1	0	–	8	–	2
$ – Conference champion

The 1940 Rollins Tars football team represented Rollins College during the 1940 college football season, and won the Southern Intercollegiate Athletic Association (SIAA) title. The Tars were disappointed the Florida Gators did not meet a challenge for a state championship.

Rollins was ranked at No. 96 (out of 697 college football teams) in the final rankings under the Litkenhous Difference by Score system for 1940.

== Schedule ==
Date	Time	Opponent	Site	Result	Attendance	Source
September 12		at Western Carolina*	McCormick Field; Asheville, NC	W 53–0	1,500	
September 21		at Davidson*	Richardson Field; Davidson, NC	L 7–19		
September 27	8:00 p.m.	at Presbyterian	Bailey Stadium; Clinton, SC	W 20–7	1,500	
October 11	8:00 p.m.	at Stetson	Hulley Field; DeLand, FL	W 25–12	3,500	
October 18		Tampa	Orlando Stadium; Orlando, FL	W 39–0	3,000	
November 2		Appalachian State*	Orlando Stadium; Orlando, FL	W 30–3	2,500	
November 9		at Miami (FL)	Burdine Stadium; Miami, FL	W 7–0	15,914	
November 22		at Tampa	Phillips Field; Tampa, FL	W 20–6	4,000	
November 29	8:15 p.m.	Stetson	Orlando Stadium; Orlando, FL	W 34–0	5,000	
*Non-conference game; All times are in Eastern time
