= 1940 Tennessee Tech Golden Eagles football team =

American college football season

1940 Tennessee Tech Golden Eagles football
- Conference: Southern Intercollegiate Athletic Association
- Record: 2–6 (1–2 SIAA)
- Head coach: Preston Vaughn Overall (18th season)

1940 Southern Intercollegiate Athletic Association football standings
	Conf.					Overall
Team	W		L		T	W		L		T
Rollins $	6	–	0	–	0	8	–	1	–	0
Newberry	4	–	0	–	0	7	–	2	–	1
Mississippi College	2	–	0	–	0	5	–	1	–	1
Eastern Kentucky	1	–	0	–	0	8	–	0	–	0
Western Kentucky State Teachers	4	–	1	–	1	7	–	1	–	1
Louisiana Normal	4	–	1	–	1	6	–	3	–	1
SW Louisiana	4	–	1	–	0	6	–	3	–	1
Union (TN)	3	–	1	–	0	6	–	3	–	0
Georgetown (KY)	2	–	1	–	0	5	–	3	–	2
Murray State	4	–	2	–	1	4	–	3	–	2
Centre	2	–	1	–	0	3	–	6	–	0
Miami (FL)	2	–	1	–	0	3	–	7	–	0
Presbyterian	5	–	3	–	0	6	–	4	–	0
Mississippi Southern	3	–	2	–	0	7	–	4	–	0
Louisiana Tech	3	–	2	–	0	6	–	4	–	0
West Tennessee State Teachers	4	–	3	–	0	5	–	5	–	0
Morehead State	1	–	1	–	2	3	–	3	–	2
Wofford	2	–	2	–	1	3	–	4	–	2
Middle Tennessee State Teachers	2	–	4	–	0	4	–	4	–	0
Tampa	2	–	4	–	0	3	–	6	–	0
Oglethorpe	2	–	4	–	0	2	–	6	–	0
Tennessee Tech	1	–	2	–	0	2	–	6	–	0
Transylvania	1	–	2	–	1	5	–	3	–	1
Stetson	2	–	5	–	1	2	–	5	–	1
Troy State	1	–	3	–	0	3	–	6	–	0
Louisiana College	1	–	4	–	2	2	–	5	–	2
Union (KY)	0	–	1	–	1	5	–	1	–	1
Centenary	0	–	2	–	0	3	–	7	–	0
Louisville	0	–	2	–	0	3	–	5	–	1
Jacksonville State	0	–	2	–	0	3	–	5	–	0
Erskine	0	–	5	–	0	1	–	8	–	0
Delta State	0	–	5	–	1	0	–	8	–	2
$ – Conference champion

The 1940 Tennessee Tech Golden Eagles football team represented Tennessee Polytechnic Institute (TPI)—now known as Tennessee Tech–as a member of the Southern Intercollegiate Athletic Association (SIAA) during the 1940 college football season. Led by 18th-year head coach Preston Vaughn Overall, the Golden Eagles compiled an overall record of 2–6 with a mark of 1–2 in conference play.

== Schedule ==
Date	Time	Opponent	Site	Result	Attendance	Source
September 27	8:00 p.m.	at Chattanooga*	Chamberlain Field; Chattanooga, TN	L 0–28	4,906	
October 4		West Tennessee State Teachers	Cookeville, TN	W 16–13		
October 12		at Sewanee*	Hardee Field; Sewanee, TN	L 6–25	1,500	
October 19		at Western Kentucky State Teachers	Western Stadium; Bowling Green, KY	L 0–6		
October 26		at Youngstown*	Youngstown, OH	L 13–28		
November 8		Maryville (TN)*^{†}	Cookeville, TN	W 35–0		
November 16	2:00 p.m.	at Vanderbilt*	Dudley Field; Nashville, TN	L 0–21	4,000	
November 28	2:00 p.m.	at Middle Tennessee State Teachers	Horace Jones Field; Murfreesboro, TN	L 0–6	3,000	
*Non-conference game; ^{†}Homecoming; All times are in Central time
