= 1940 Georgetown Tigers football team =

American college football season

1940 Georgetown Tigers football
- Conference: Kentucky Intercollegiate Athletic Conference, Southern Intercollegiate Athletic Association
- Record: 5–3–2 (2–1 KIAC, 2–1 SIAA)
- Head coach: Robert K. Evans (6th season)
- Home stadium: Hinton Field

1940 Kentucky Intercollegiate Athletic Conference football standings
	Conf.					Overall
Team	W		L		T	W		L		T
Centre $	2	–	0	–	0	3	–	6	–	0
Eastern Kentucky	1	–	0	–	0	8	–	0	–	0
Western Kentucky State Teachers	1	–	0	–	1	7	–	1	–	1
Georgetown (KY)	2	–	1	–	0	5	–	3	–	2
Transylvania	1	–	2	–	1	5	–	3	–	1
Morehead State	1	–	1	–	2	3	–	2	–	2
Union (KY)	0	–	1	–	1	5	–	1	–	1
Murray State	0	–	1	–	1	4	–	3	–	2
Louisville	0	–	2	–	0	3	–	5	–	1
$ – Conference champion

1940 Southern Intercollegiate Athletic Association football standings
	Conf.					Overall
Team	W		L		T	W		L		T
Rollins $	6	–	0	–	0	8	–	1	–	0
Newberry	4	–	0	–	0	7	–	2	–	1
Mississippi College	2	–	0	–	0	5	–	1	–	1
Eastern Kentucky	1	–	0	–	0	8	–	0	–	0
Western Kentucky State Teachers	4	–	1	–	1	7	–	1	–	1
Louisiana Normal	4	–	1	–	1	6	–	3	–	1
SW Louisiana	4	–	1	–	0	6	–	3	–	1
Union (TN)	3	–	1	–	0	6	–	3	–	0
Georgetown (KY)	2	–	1	–	0	5	–	3	–	2
Murray State	4	–	2	–	1	4	–	3	–	2
Centre	2	–	1	–	0	3	–	6	–	0
Miami (FL)	2	–	1	–	0	3	–	7	–	0
Presbyterian	5	–	3	–	0	6	–	4	–	0
Mississippi Southern	3	–	2	–	0	7	–	4	–	0
Louisiana Tech	3	–	2	–	0	6	–	4	–	0
West Tennessee State Teachers	4	–	3	–	0	5	–	5	–	0
Morehead State	1	–	1	–	2	3	–	3	–	2
Wofford	2	–	2	–	1	3	–	4	–	2
Middle Tennessee State Teachers	2	–	4	–	0	4	–	4	–	0
Tampa	2	–	4	–	0	3	–	6	–	0
Oglethorpe	2	–	4	–	0	2	–	6	–	0
Tennessee Tech	1	–	2	–	0	2	–	6	–	0
Transylvania	1	–	2	–	1	5	–	3	–	1
Stetson	2	–	5	–	1	2	–	5	–	1
Troy State	1	–	3	–	0	3	–	6	–	0
Louisiana College	1	–	4	–	2	2	–	5	–	2
Union (KY)	0	–	1	–	1	5	–	1	–	1
Centenary	0	–	2	–	0	3	–	7	–	0
Louisville	0	–	2	–	0	3	–	5	–	1
Jacksonville State	0	–	2	–	0	3	–	5	–	0
Erskine	0	–	5	–	0	1	–	8	–	0
Delta State	0	–	5	–	1	0	–	8	–	2
$ – Conference champion

The 1940 Georgetown Tigers football team represented Georgetown College as a member the Kentucky Intercollegiate Athletic Conference (KIAC) and the Southern Intercollegiate Athletic Association (SIAA) during the 1940 college football season. Led by sixth-year head coach Robert K. Evans, the Tigers compiled an overall record of 5–3–2 with a mark of 2–1 in both KIAC and SIAA play. The team played home games at Hinton Field in Georgetown, Kentucky.

== Schedule ==
Date	Time	Opponent	Site	Result	Attendance	Source
September 20	8:30 p.m.	at Xavier*	Xavier Stadium; Cincinnati, OH	L 0–20		
September 28		Marietta*	Hinton Field; Georgetown, KY	W 21–0		
October 5		at Manchester*	North Manchester, IN	T 0–0		
October 12	2:00 p.m.	Carson–Newman*	Hinton Field; Georgetown, KY	W 14–0	2,000	
October 18		at Muskingum*	Municipal Stadium; New Concord, OH	L 0–19		
October 26		Wabash*^{†}	Hinton Field; Georgetown, KY	T 0–0	2,000	
November 2	2:00 p.m.	at Louisville	duPont Manual Stadium; Louisville, KY	W 19–14	2,000	
November 8	2:00 p.m.	Union (KY)	Hinton Field; Georgetown, KY	W 27–7	1,500	
November 16		Evansville*	Hinton Field; Georgetown, KY	W 27–7		
November 21	2:00 p.m.	at Transylvania	Thomas Field; Lexington, KY	L 6–7	3,000	
*Non-conference game; ^{†}Homecoming; All times are in Eastern time
