= 1940 Eastern Kentucky Maroons football team =

American college football season

1940 Eastern Kentucky Maroons football

KIAC champion
- Conference: Kentucky Intercollegiate Athletic Conference, Southern Intercollegiate Athletic Association
- Record: 8–0 (1–0 KIAC, 1–0 SIAA)
- Head coach: Rome Rankin (6th season)
- Home stadium: Hanger Stadium

1940 Kentucky Intercollegiate Athletic Conference football standings
| | Conf. | | | | | Overall |
| Team | W | | L | | T | W | | L | | T |
|---|---|---|---|---|---|---|---|---|---|---|
| Centre $ | 2 | – | 0 | – | 0 | 3 | – | 6 | – | 0 |
| Eastern Kentucky | 1 | – | 0 | – | 0 | 8 | – | 0 | – | 0 |
| Western Kentucky State Teachers | 1 | – | 0 | – | 1 | 7 | – | 1 | – | 1 |
| Georgetown (KY) | 2 | – | 1 | – | 0 | 5 | – | 3 | – | 2 |
| Transylvania | 1 | – | 2 | – | 1 | 5 | – | 3 | – | 1 |
| Morehead State | 1 | – | 1 | – | 2 | 3 | – | 2 | – | 2 |
| Union (KY) | 0 | – | 1 | – | 1 | 5 | – | 1 | – | 1 |
| Murray State | 0 | – | 1 | – | 1 | 4 | – | 3 | – | 2 |
| Louisville | 0 | – | 2 | – | 0 | 3 | – | 5 | – | 1 |
$ – Conference champion

1940 Southern Intercollegiate Athletic Association football standings
| | Conf. | | | | | Overall |
| Team | W | | L | | T | W | | L | | T |
|---|---|---|---|---|---|---|---|---|---|---|
| Rollins $ | 6 | – | 0 | – | 0 | 8 | – | 1 | – | 0 |
| Newberry | 4 | – | 0 | – | 0 | 7 | – | 2 | – | 1 |
| Mississippi College | 2 | – | 0 | – | 0 | 5 | – | 1 | – | 1 |
| Eastern Kentucky | 1 | – | 0 | – | 0 | 8 | – | 0 | – | 0 |
| Western Kentucky State Teachers | 4 | – | 1 | – | 1 | 7 | – | 1 | – | 1 |
| Louisiana Normal | 4 | – | 1 | – | 1 | 6 | – | 3 | – | 1 |
| SW Louisiana | 4 | – | 1 | – | 0 | 6 | – | 3 | – | 1 |
| Union (TN) | 3 | – | 1 | – | 0 | 6 | – | 3 | – | 0 |
| Georgetown (KY) | 2 | – | 1 | – | 0 | 5 | – | 3 | – | 2 |
| Murray State | 4 | – | 2 | – | 1 | 4 | – | 3 | – | 2 |
| Centre | 2 | – | 1 | – | 0 | 3 | – | 6 | – | 0 |
| Miami (FL) | 2 | – | 1 | – | 0 | 3 | – | 7 | – | 0 |
| Presbyterian | 5 | – | 3 | – | 0 | 6 | – | 4 | – | 0 |
| Mississippi Southern | 3 | – | 2 | – | 0 | 7 | – | 4 | – | 0 |
| Louisiana Tech | 3 | – | 2 | – | 0 | 6 | – | 4 | – | 0 |
| West Tennessee State Teachers | 4 | – | 3 | – | 0 | 5 | – | 5 | – | 0 |
| Morehead State | 1 | – | 1 | – | 2 | 3 | – | 3 | – | 2 |
| Wofford | 2 | – | 2 | – | 1 | 3 | – | 4 | – | 2 |
| Middle Tennessee State Teachers | 2 | – | 4 | – | 0 | 4 | – | 4 | – | 0 |
| Tampa | 2 | – | 4 | – | 0 | 3 | – | 6 | – | 0 |
| Oglethorpe | 2 | – | 4 | – | 0 | 2 | – | 6 | – | 0 |
| Tennessee Tech | 1 | – | 2 | – | 0 | 2 | – | 6 | – | 0 |
| Transylvania | 1 | – | 2 | – | 1 | 5 | – | 3 | – | 1 |
| Stetson | 2 | – | 5 | – | 1 | 2 | – | 5 | – | 1 |
| Troy State | 1 | – | 3 | – | 0 | 3 | – | 6 | – | 0 |
| Louisiana College | 1 | – | 4 | – | 2 | 2 | – | 5 | – | 2 |
| Union (KY) | 0 | – | 1 | – | 1 | 5 | – | 1 | – | 1 |
| Centenary | 0 | – | 2 | – | 0 | 3 | – | 7 | – | 0 |
| Louisville | 0 | – | 2 | – | 0 | 3 | – | 5 | – | 1 |
| Jacksonville State | 0 | – | 2 | – | 0 | 3 | – | 5 | – | 0 |
| Erskine | 0 | – | 5 | – | 0 | 1 | – | 8 | – | 0 |
| Delta State | 0 | – | 5 | – | 1 | 0 | – | 8 | – | 2 |
$ – Conference champion

The 1940 Eastern Kentucky Maroons football team was an American football team that represented Eastern Kentucky State College—now known as Eastern Kentucky University—as a member of the Kentucky Intercollegiate Athletic Conference (KIAC) and the Southern Intercollegiate Athletic Association (SIAA) during the 1940 college football season. In their sixth season under head coach Rome Rankin, the Maroons compiled a perfect 8–0 record with a mark of 1–0 in both KAIC and SIAA play, won the KIAC championship, and outscored opponents by a total of 273 to 30. It was the first undefeated season in Eastern Kentucky football history.

== Schedule ==
| Date | Time | Opponent | Site | Result | Attendance | Source |
|---|---|---|---|---|---|---|
| September 21 | | at Illinois State Normal* | McCormick Field; Normal, IL | W 20–0 | | |
| September 28 | 2:00 p.m. | Arkansas A&M* | Hanger Stadium; Richmond, KY | W 39–0 | 1,500 | |
| October 5 | 2:00 p.m. | Northern Illinois*^{†} | Hanger Stadium; Richmond, KY | W 35–0 | | |
| October 19 | 8:00 p.m. | at King* | Bristol Municipal Stadium; Bristol, TN | W 31–7 | | |
| October 26 | | Morehead State | Hanger Stadium; Richmond, KY (Old Hawg Rifle) | W 27–13 | 3,500 | |
| November 2 | | Cumberland (TN) | Hanger Stadium; Richmond, KY | W 48–7 | | |
| November 9 | | at Central Michigan* | Alumni Field; Mount Pleasant, MI | W 25–0 | | |
| November 16 | 2:00 p.m. | Bowling Green* | Hanger Stadium; Richmond, KY | W 48–0 | | |
*Non-conference game; ^{†}Homecoming; All times are in Eastern time
