= 1940 Centre Colonels football team =

American college football season

1940 Centre Colonels football

KIAC champion
- Conference: Kentucky Intercollegiate Athletic Conference, Southern Intercollegiate Athletic Association
- Record: 3–6 (2–0 KIAC, 2–1 SIAA)
- Head coach: J. Quinn Decker (3rd season)
- Home stadium: Farris Stadium

1940 Kentucky Intercollegiate Athletic Conference football standings
	Conf.					Overall
Team	W		L		T	W		L		T
Centre $	2	–	0	–	0	3	–	6	–	0
Eastern Kentucky	1	–	0	–	0	8	–	0	–	0
Western Kentucky State Teachers	1	–	0	–	1	7	–	1	–	1
Georgetown (KY)	2	–	1	–	0	5	–	3	–	2
Transylvania	1	–	2	–	1	5	–	3	–	1
Morehead State	1	–	1	–	2	3	–	2	–	2
Union (KY)	0	–	1	–	1	5	–	1	–	1
Murray State	0	–	1	–	1	4	–	3	–	2
Louisville	0	–	2	–	0	3	–	5	–	1
$ – Conference champion

1940 Southern Intercollegiate Athletic Association football standings
	Conf.					Overall
Team	W		L		T	W		L		T
Rollins $	6	–	0	–	0	8	–	1	–	0
Newberry	4	–	0	–	0	7	–	2	–	1
Mississippi College	2	–	0	–	0	5	–	1	–	1
Eastern Kentucky	1	–	0	–	0	8	–	0	–	0
Western Kentucky State Teachers	4	–	1	–	1	7	–	1	–	1
Louisiana Normal	4	–	1	–	1	6	–	3	–	1
SW Louisiana	4	–	1	–	0	6	–	3	–	1
Union (TN)	3	–	1	–	0	6	–	3	–	0
Georgetown (KY)	2	–	1	–	0	5	–	3	–	2
Murray State	4	–	2	–	1	4	–	3	–	2
Centre	2	–	1	–	0	3	–	6	–	0
Miami (FL)	2	–	1	–	0	3	–	7	–	0
Presbyterian	5	–	3	–	0	6	–	4	–	0
Mississippi Southern	3	–	2	–	0	7	–	4	–	0
Louisiana Tech	3	–	2	–	0	6	–	4	–	0
West Tennessee State Teachers	4	–	3	–	0	5	–	5	–	0
Morehead State	1	–	1	–	2	3	–	3	–	2
Wofford	2	–	2	–	1	3	–	4	–	2
Middle Tennessee State Teachers	2	–	4	–	0	4	–	4	–	0
Tampa	2	–	4	–	0	3	–	6	–	0
Oglethorpe	2	–	4	–	0	2	–	6	–	0
Tennessee Tech	1	–	2	–	0	2	–	6	–	0
Transylvania	1	–	2	–	1	5	–	3	–	1
Stetson	2	–	5	–	1	2	–	5	–	1
Troy State	1	–	3	–	0	3	–	6	–	0
Louisiana College	1	–	4	–	2	2	–	5	–	2
Union (KY)	0	–	1	–	1	5	–	1	–	1
Centenary	0	–	2	–	0	3	–	7	–	0
Louisville	0	–	2	–	0	3	–	5	–	1
Jacksonville State	0	–	2	–	0	3	–	5	–	0
Erskine	0	–	5	–	0	1	–	8	–	0
Delta State	0	–	5	–	1	0	–	8	–	2
$ – Conference champion

The 1940 Centre Colonels football team represented Centre College as a member the Kentucky Intercollegiate Athletic Conference (KIAC) and the Southern Intercollegiate Athletic Association (SIAA) during the 1940 college football season. Led by third-year head coach J. Quinn Decker, the Colonels compiled an overall record of 3–6 with a marks of 2–0 KIAC play and 2–1 against SIAA opponents.

Key players included triple-threat halfback Jack Haddock.

== Schedule ==
Date	Time	Opponent	Site	Result	Attendance	Source
September 21		at Boston College*	Alumni Field; Chestnut Hill, MA	L 0–40	19,000	
September 28		at Mississippi College	Provine Field; Clinton, MS	L 13–30		
October 5	2:00 p.m.	Hanover*	Farris Stadium; Danville, KY	W 35–0	1,500	
October 12	8:30 p.m.	at Cincinnati*	Nippert Stadium; Cincinnati, OH	L 0–22	12,000	
October 18		at Louisville	Maxwell Field; Louisville, KY	W 28–0	5,000	
November 2		at Davidson*	Richardson Field; Davidson, NC	L 12–27	5,000	
November 9		at Chattanooga*	Chamberlain Field; Chattanooga, TN	L 9–14	4,000	
November 16	2:00 p.m.	VPI*^{†}	Farris Stadium; Danville, KY	L 6–10	4,000	
November 29	2:00 p.m.	Transylvania	Farris Stadium; Danville, KY	W 36–7		
*Non-conference game; ^{†}Homecoming; All times are in Eastern time
