= 1940 Miami Hurricanes football team =

American college football season

1940 Miami Hurricanes football
- Conference: Southern Intercollegiate Athletic Association
- Record: 3–7 (2–1 SIAA)
- Head coach: Jack Harding (4th season)
- Home stadium: Burdine Stadium

1940 Southern Intercollegiate Athletic Association football standings
	Conf.					Overall
Team	W		L		T	W		L		T
Rollins $	6	–	0	–	0	8	–	1	–	0
Newberry	4	–	0	–	0	7	–	2	–	1
Mississippi College	2	–	0	–	0	5	–	1	–	1
Eastern Kentucky	1	–	0	–	0	8	–	0	–	0
Western Kentucky State Teachers	4	–	1	–	1	7	–	1	–	1
Louisiana Normal	4	–	1	–	1	6	–	3	–	1
SW Louisiana	4	–	1	–	0	6	–	3	–	1
Union (TN)	3	–	1	–	0	6	–	3	–	0
Georgetown (KY)	2	–	1	–	0	5	–	3	–	2
Murray State	4	–	2	–	1	4	–	3	–	2
Centre	2	–	1	–	0	3	–	6	–	0
Miami (FL)	2	–	1	–	0	3	–	7	–	0
Presbyterian	5	–	3	–	0	6	–	4	–	0
Mississippi Southern	3	–	2	–	0	7	–	4	–	0
Louisiana Tech	3	–	2	–	0	6	–	4	–	0
West Tennessee State Teachers	4	–	3	–	0	5	–	5	–	0
Morehead State	1	–	1	–	2	3	–	3	–	2
Wofford	2	–	2	–	1	3	–	4	–	2
Middle Tennessee State Teachers	2	–	4	–	0	4	–	4	–	0
Tampa	2	–	4	–	0	3	–	6	–	0
Oglethorpe	2	–	4	–	0	2	–	6	–	0
Tennessee Tech	1	–	2	–	0	2	–	6	–	0
Transylvania	1	–	2	–	1	5	–	3	–	1
Stetson	2	–	5	–	1	2	–	5	–	1
Troy State	1	–	3	–	0	3	–	6	–	0
Louisiana College	1	–	4	–	2	2	–	5	–	2
Union (KY)	0	–	1	–	1	5	–	1	–	1
Centenary	0	–	2	–	0	3	–	7	–	0
Louisville	0	–	2	–	0	3	–	5	–	1
Jacksonville State	0	–	2	–	0	3	–	5	–	0
Erskine	0	–	5	–	0	1	–	8	–	0
Delta State	0	–	5	–	1	0	–	8	–	2
$ – Conference champion

The 1940 Miami Hurricanes football team represented the University of Miami as a member of the Southern Intercollegiate Athletic Association (SIAA) in the 1940 college football season. The Hurricanes played their nine home games at Burdine Stadium in Miami, Florida. The team was led by fourth-year head coach Jack Harding and finished with a 3–7 record.

Miami was ranked at No. 156 (out of 697 college football teams) in the final rankings under the Litkenhous Difference by Score system for 1940.

== Schedule ==
Date	Time	Opponent	Site	Result	Attendance	Source
October 4	8:15 p.m.	Stetson	Burdine Stadium; Miami, FL	W 19–0	17,331–18,000	
October 11		Tampa	Burdine Stadium; Miami, FL	W 27–0	14,000	
October 18		Catholic University*	Burdine Stadium; Miami, FL	L 18–20	21,000	
October 25		Elon*	Burdine Stadium; Miami, FL	W 31–7	15,600	
November 1		at Texas Tech*	Tech Field; Lubbock, TX	L 14–61	9,000	
November 8		Rollins	Burdine Stadium; Miami, FL	L 0–7	15,914	
November 16	8:30 p.m.	Florida*	Burdine Stadium; Miami, FL (rivalry)	L 6–46	17,365	
November 22		South Carolina*	Burdine Stadium; Miami, FL	L 2–7	11,000	
November 29		Ole Miss*	Burdine Stadium; Miami, FL	L 7–21	26,000	
December 6		Georgia*	Burdine Stadium; Miami, FL	L 7–28	11,860–15,000	
*Non-conference game; All times are in Eastern time
