= 1940 Stetson Hatters football team =

American college football season

1940 Stetson Hatters football
- Conference: Southern Intercollegiate Athletic Association
- Record: 2–5–1 (2–5–1 SIAA)
- Head coach: Brady Cowell (6th season)
- Home stadium: Hulley Field

1940 Southern Intercollegiate Athletic Association football standings
	Conf.					Overall
Team	W		L		T	W		L		T
Rollins $	6	–	0	–	0	8	–	1	–	0
Newberry	4	–	0	–	0	7	–	2	–	1
Mississippi College	2	–	0	–	0	5	–	1	–	1
Eastern Kentucky	1	–	0	–	0	8	–	0	–	0
Western Kentucky State Teachers	4	–	1	–	1	7	–	1	–	1
Louisiana Normal	4	–	1	–	1	6	–	3	–	1
SW Louisiana	4	–	1	–	0	6	–	3	–	1
Union (TN)	3	–	1	–	0	6	–	3	–	0
Georgetown (KY)	2	–	1	–	0	5	–	3	–	2
Murray State	4	–	2	–	1	4	–	3	–	2
Centre	2	–	1	–	0	3	–	6	–	0
Miami (FL)	2	–	1	–	0	3	–	7	–	0
Presbyterian	5	–	3	–	0	6	–	4	–	0
Mississippi Southern	3	–	2	–	0	7	–	4	–	0
Louisiana Tech	3	–	2	–	0	6	–	4	–	0
West Tennessee State Teachers	4	–	3	–	0	5	–	5	–	0
Morehead State	1	–	1	–	2	3	–	3	–	2
Wofford	2	–	2	–	1	3	–	4	–	2
Middle Tennessee State Teachers	2	–	4	–	0	4	–	4	–	0
Tampa	2	–	4	–	0	3	–	6	–	0
Oglethorpe	2	–	4	–	0	2	–	6	–	0
Tennessee Tech	1	–	2	–	0	2	–	6	–	0
Transylvania	1	–	2	–	1	5	–	3	–	1
Stetson	2	–	5	–	1	2	–	5	–	1
Troy State	1	–	3	–	0	3	–	6	–	0
Louisiana College	1	–	4	–	2	2	–	5	–	2
Union (KY)	0	–	1	–	1	5	–	1	–	1
Centenary	0	–	2	–	0	3	–	7	–	0
Louisville	0	–	2	–	0	3	–	5	–	1
Jacksonville State	0	–	2	–	0	3	–	5	–	0
Erskine	0	–	5	–	0	1	–	8	–	0
Delta State	0	–	5	–	1	0	–	8	–	2
$ – Conference champion

The 1940 Stetson Hatters football team represented Stetson University as a member of the Dixie Conference during the 1940 college football season. Led by sixth-year head coach Brady Cowell, the Hatters compiled an overall record of 2–5–1 with an identical mark in conference play. Stetson played home games at Hulley Field in DeLand, Florida.

== Schedule ==
Date	Time	Opponent	Site	Result	Attendance	Source
September 27	8:00 p.m.	Tampa	Phillips Field; Tampa, FL	L 0–6	6,500–7,000	
October 4	8:15 p.m.	at Miami (FL)	Burdine Stadium; Miami, FL	L 0–19	17,331–18,000	
October 11	8:00 p.m.	Rollins	Hulley Field; DeLand, FL	L 12–25	3,500	
October 18		Erskine	Hulley Field; DeLand, FL	W 19–13		
November 2	3:00 p.m.	Tampa^{†}	Hulley Field; DeLand, FL	W 19–13	2,500–3,000	
November 9	2:30 p.m.	at Wofford	Snyder Field; Spartanburg, SC	T 7–7		
November 22		vs. Presbyterian	Ocala, FL	L 0–6	2,000	
November 29	8:15 p.m.	at Rollins	Greater Orlando Stadium; Orlando, FL	L 0–34	5,000	
^{†}Homecoming; All times are in Eastern time
