= 1940 Centenary Gentlemen football team =

American college football season

1940 Centenary Gentlemen football
- Conference: Louisiana Intercollegiate Conference, Southern Intercollegiate Athletic Association
- Record: 3–7 (0–2 LIC, 0–2 SIAA)
- Head coach: Jake Hanna (1st season)
- Home stadium: Centenary Field

1940 Louisiana Intercollegiate Conference football standings
	Conf.					Overall
Team	W		L		T	W		L		T
Southwestern Louisiana $	4	–	0	–	0	6	–	3	–	1
Louisiana Normal	3	–	1	–	1	6	–	3	–	1
Louisiana Tech	3	–	2	–	0	6	–	4	–	0
Louisiana College	0	–	2	–	1	2	–	5	–	2
Centenary	0	–	2	–	0	3	–	7	–	0
Southeastern Louisiana	0	–	3	–	0	3	–	6	–	1
$ – Conference champion

1940 Southern Intercollegiate Athletic Association football standings
	Conf.					Overall
Team	W		L		T	W		L		T
Rollins $	6	–	0	–	0	8	–	1	–	0
Newberry	4	–	0	–	0	7	–	2	–	1
Mississippi College	2	–	0	–	0	5	–	1	–	1
Eastern Kentucky	1	–	0	–	0	8	–	0	–	0
Western Kentucky State Teachers	4	–	1	–	1	7	–	1	–	1
Louisiana Normal	4	–	1	–	1	6	–	3	–	1
SW Louisiana	4	–	1	–	0	6	–	3	–	1
Union (TN)	3	–	1	–	0	6	–	3	–	0
Georgetown (KY)	2	–	1	–	0	5	–	3	–	2
Murray State	4	–	2	–	1	4	–	3	–	2
Centre	2	–	1	–	0	3	–	6	–	0
Miami (FL)	2	–	1	–	0	3	–	7	–	0
Presbyterian	5	–	3	–	0	6	–	4	–	0
Mississippi Southern	3	–	2	–	0	7	–	4	–	0
Louisiana Tech	3	–	2	–	0	6	–	4	–	0
West Tennessee State Teachers	4	–	3	–	0	5	–	5	–	0
Morehead State	1	–	1	–	2	3	–	3	–	2
Wofford	2	–	2	–	1	3	–	4	–	2
Middle Tennessee State Teachers	2	–	4	–	0	4	–	4	–	0
Tampa	2	–	4	–	0	3	–	6	–	0
Oglethorpe	2	–	4	–	0	2	–	6	–	0
Tennessee Tech	1	–	2	–	0	2	–	6	–	0
Transylvania	1	–	2	–	1	5	–	3	–	1
Stetson	2	–	5	–	1	2	–	5	–	1
Troy State	1	–	3	–	0	3	–	6	–	0
Louisiana College	1	–	4	–	2	2	–	5	–	2
Union (KY)	0	–	1	–	1	5	–	1	–	1
Centenary	0	–	2	–	0	3	–	7	–	0
Louisville	0	–	2	–	0	3	–	5	–	1
Jacksonville State	0	–	2	–	0	3	–	5	–	0
Erskine	0	–	5	–	0	1	–	8	–	0
Delta State	0	–	5	–	1	0	–	8	–	2
$ – Conference champion

The 1940 Centenary Gentlemen football team was an American football team that represented the Centenary College of Louisiana as a member of the Louisiana Intercollegiate Conference (LIC) and the Southern Intercollegiate Athletic Association (SIAA) the 1940 college football season. In their first year under head coach Jake Hanna, the Gentlemen compiled an overall record of 3–7 with marks of 0–2 in both SIC and SIAA play.

Centenary was ranked at No. 139 (out of 697 college football teams) in the final rankings under the Litkenhous Difference by Score system for 1940.

== Schedule ==
Date	Time	Opponent	Site	Result	Attendance	Source
September 21		Hardin–Simmons*	Centenary Field; Shreveport, LA	L 13–15	6,000	
September 28		at TCU*	Amon G. Carter Stadium; Fort Worth, TX	L 6–41	8,000	
October 5		at Rice*	Rice Field; Houston, TX	L 0–25		
October 12	7:30 p.m.	Saint Louis*	Centenary Field; Shreveport, LA	W 19–6	5,000	
October 19		at Arizona*	Arizona Stadium; Tucson, AZ	L 6–29	10,000	
October 25		at Louisiana Normal	Demon Stadium; Natchitoches, LA	L 0–7	6,000	
November 2	2:00 p.m.	at Washington University*	Francis Field; St. Louis, MO	W 19–14	3,000	
November 11		at Texas Tech*	Tech Field; Lubbock, TX	L 6–26	8,000	
November 23		at Southwestern (TN)*	Crump Stadium; Memphis, TN	W 14–6	4,000	
November 28		Louisiana Tech	Centenary Field; Shreveport, LA	L 0–6	5,000	
*Non-conference game; All times are in Central time
