= 1940 Troy State Red Wave football team =

American college football season

1940 Troy State Red Wave football
- Conference: Alabama Intercollegiate Conference, Southern Intercollegiate Athletic Association
- Record: 3–6 (2–1 AIC, 1–3 SIAA)
- Head coach: Albert Choate (4th season)
- Home stadium: Pace Field

1940 Southern Intercollegiate Athletic Association football standings
	Conf.					Overall
Team	W		L		T	W		L		T
Rollins $	6	–	0	–	0	8	–	1	–	0
Newberry	4	–	0	–	0	7	–	2	–	1
Mississippi College	2	–	0	–	0	5	–	1	–	1
Eastern Kentucky	1	–	0	–	0	8	–	0	–	0
Western Kentucky State Teachers	4	–	1	–	1	7	–	1	–	1
Louisiana Normal	4	–	1	–	1	6	–	3	–	1
SW Louisiana	4	–	1	–	0	6	–	3	–	1
Union (TN)	3	–	1	–	0	6	–	3	–	0
Georgetown (KY)	2	–	1	–	0	5	–	3	–	2
Murray State	4	–	2	–	1	4	–	3	–	2
Centre	2	–	1	–	0	3	–	6	–	0
Miami (FL)	2	–	1	–	0	3	–	7	–	0
Presbyterian	5	–	3	–	0	6	–	4	–	0
Mississippi Southern	3	–	2	–	0	7	–	4	–	0
Louisiana Tech	3	–	2	–	0	6	–	4	–	0
West Tennessee State Teachers	4	–	3	–	0	5	–	5	–	0
Morehead State	1	–	1	–	2	3	–	3	–	2
Wofford	2	–	2	–	1	3	–	4	–	2
Middle Tennessee State Teachers	2	–	4	–	0	4	–	4	–	0
Tampa	2	–	4	–	0	3	–	6	–	0
Oglethorpe	2	–	4	–	0	2	–	6	–	0
Tennessee Tech	1	–	2	–	0	2	–	6	–	0
Transylvania	1	–	2	–	1	5	–	3	–	1
Stetson	2	–	5	–	1	2	–	5	–	1
Troy State	1	–	3	–	0	3	–	6	–	0
Louisiana College	1	–	4	–	2	2	–	5	–	2
Union (KY)	0	–	1	–	1	5	–	1	–	1
Centenary	0	–	2	–	0	3	–	7	–	0
Louisville	0	–	2	–	0	3	–	5	–	1
Jacksonville State	0	–	2	–	0	3	–	5	–	0
Erskine	0	–	5	–	0	1	–	8	–	0
Delta State	0	–	5	–	1	0	–	8	–	2
$ – Conference champion

The 1940 Troy State Red Wave football team represented Troy State Teachers College (now known as Troy University) as a member of the Alabama Intercollegiate Conference (AIC) and the Southern Intercollegiate Athletic Association (SIAA) during the 1940 college football season. Led by fourth-year head coach Albert Choate, the Red Wave compiled an overall record of 3–6, with a mark of 2–1 in AIC play. Troy State had a record of 1–3 against SIAA opponents, tying for 22nd place.

== Schedule ==
Date	Opponent	Site	Result	Attendance	Source
September 27	at Mississippi Southern	Faulkner Field; Hattiesburg, MS	L 0–25		
October 4	at Spring Hill*	Dorn Stadium; Mobile, AL	L 0–20		
October 12	Oglethorpe	Pace Field; Troy, AL	L 7–20	1,400	
October 19	at Georgia Teachers*	Statesboro, GA	W 14–0		
October 25	Marion	Pace Field; Troy, AL	W 19–0		
November 1	West Tennessee State	Cramton Bowl; Montgomery, AL	L 7–31		
November 8	Jacksonville State	Pace Field; Troy, AL (rivalry)	W 7–0		
November 15	Livingston State	Wiregrass Stadium; Dothan, AL	L 12–7		
November 22	vs. Snead*	Tallassee H.S. Stadium; Tallassee, AL	L 6–7		
*Non-conference game
