= 1940 Mississippi College Choctaws football team =

American college football season

1940 Mississippi College Choctaws football

Dixie co-champion
- Conference: Dixie Conference, Southern Intercollegiate Athletic Association
- Record: 5–1–1 (3–0–1 Dixie, 2–0 SIAA)
- Head coach: Stanley L. Robinson (16th season)
- Home stadium: Provine Field

1940 Dixie Conference football standings
	Conf.					Overall
Team	W		L		T	W		L		T
Chattanooga +	3	–	0	–	1	7	–	1	–	1
Mississippi College +	3	–	0	–	1	5	–	1	–	1
Howard (AL)	4	–	1	–	0	4	–	5	–	0
Spring Hill	1	–	3	–	0	3	–	5	–	0
Southwestern (TN)	0	–	1	–	0	3	–	5	–	1
Millsaps	0	–	3	–	0	4	–	4	–	1
Mercer	0	–	3	–	0	1	–	7	–	0
+ – Conference co-champions

1940 Southern Intercollegiate Athletic Association football standings
	Conf.					Overall
Team	W		L		T	W		L		T
Rollins $	6	–	0	–	0	8	–	1	–	0
Newberry	4	–	0	–	0	7	–	2	–	1
Mississippi College	2	–	0	–	0	5	–	1	–	1
Eastern Kentucky	1	–	0	–	0	8	–	0	–	0
Western Kentucky State Teachers	4	–	1	–	1	7	–	1	–	1
Louisiana Normal	4	–	1	–	1	6	–	3	–	1
SW Louisiana	4	–	1	–	0	6	–	3	–	1
Union (TN)	3	–	1	–	0	6	–	3	–	0
Georgetown (KY)	2	–	1	–	0	5	–	3	–	2
Murray State	4	–	2	–	1	4	–	3	–	2
Centre	2	–	1	–	0	3	–	6	–	0
Miami (FL)	2	–	1	–	0	3	–	7	–	0
Presbyterian	5	–	3	–	0	6	–	4	–	0
Mississippi Southern	3	–	2	–	0	7	–	4	–	0
Louisiana Tech	3	–	2	–	0	6	–	4	–	0
West Tennessee State Teachers	4	–	3	–	0	5	–	5	–	0
Morehead State	1	–	1	–	2	3	–	3	–	2
Wofford	2	–	2	–	1	3	–	4	–	2
Middle Tennessee State Teachers	2	–	4	–	0	4	–	4	–	0
Tampa	2	–	4	–	0	3	–	6	–	0
Oglethorpe	2	–	4	–	0	2	–	6	–	0
Tennessee Tech	1	–	2	–	0	2	–	6	–	0
Transylvania	1	–	2	–	1	5	–	3	–	1
Stetson	2	–	5	–	1	2	–	5	–	1
Troy State	1	–	3	–	0	3	–	6	–	0
Louisiana College	1	–	4	–	2	2	–	5	–	2
Union (KY)	0	–	1	–	1	5	–	1	–	1
Centenary	0	–	2	–	0	3	–	7	–	0
Louisville	0	–	2	–	0	3	–	5	–	1
Jacksonville State	0	–	2	–	0	3	–	5	–	0
Erskine	0	–	5	–	0	1	–	8	–	0
Delta State	0	–	5	–	1	0	–	8	–	2
$ – Conference champion

The 1940 Mississippi College Choctaws football team was an American football team that represented Mississippi College as a member of the Dixie Conference and the Southern Intercollegiate Athletic Association (SIAA) during the 1940 college football season. In their 16th year under head coach Stanley L. Robinson, the Choctaws compiled a 5–1–1 overall record. Against Dixie Conference opponents, they had a 3–0–1 record and tied with Chattanooga for the conference championship. They were 2–0 against SIAA opponents, but did not play enough conference games to qualify for the SIAA championship.

With 61 points (nine touchdowns and seven points after touchdown), the Choctaws' fullback Charlie Armstrong led the Dixie Conference in scoring. His longest scoring play was a 59-yard run against Spring Hill.

Mississippi College was ranked at No. 78 (out of 687 teams) in the final rankings under the Litkenhous Difference by Score System for 1940.

The team played its home games at Provine Field in Clinton, Mississippi.

== Schedule ==
Date	Opponent	Site	Result	Attendance	Source
September 28	Centre	Provine Field; Clinton, MS	W 20–13		
October 4	at Chattanooga	Chamberlain Field; Chattanooga, TN	T 7–7	3,600	
October 12	Spring Hill	Provine Field; Clinton, MS	W 41–7		
October 26	at Colgate*	Colgate Athletic Field; Hamilton, NY	L 0–31	5,000	
November 2	Millsaps	Provine Field; Clinton, MS	W 27–0	4,000	
November 9	at Mercer	Centennial Stadium; Macon, GA	W 27–6	2,500	
November 16	Louisiana College^{†}	Provine Field; Clinton, MS	W 32–6		
*Non-conference game; ^{†}Homecoming
