= 1940 Oglethorpe Stormy Petrels football team =

American college football season

1940 Oglethorpe Stormy Petrels football
- Conference: Southern Intercollegiate Athletic Association
- Record: 2–6 (2–4 SIAA)
- Head coach: John W. Patrick (7th season)
- Captain: Ernie Sheffield
- Home stadium: Hermance Stadium

1940 Southern Intercollegiate Athletic Association football standings
	Conf.					Overall
Team	W		L		T	W		L		T
Rollins $	6	–	0	–	0	8	–	1	–	0
Newberry	4	–	0	–	0	7	–	2	–	1
Mississippi College	2	–	0	–	0	5	–	1	–	1
Eastern Kentucky	1	–	0	–	0	8	–	0	–	0
Western Kentucky State Teachers	4	–	1	–	1	7	–	1	–	1
Louisiana Normal	4	–	1	–	1	6	–	3	–	1
SW Louisiana	4	–	1	–	0	6	–	3	–	1
Union (TN)	3	–	1	–	0	6	–	3	–	0
Georgetown (KY)	2	–	1	–	0	5	–	3	–	2
Murray State	4	–	2	–	1	4	–	3	–	2
Centre	2	–	1	–	0	3	–	6	–	0
Miami (FL)	2	–	1	–	0	3	–	7	–	0
Presbyterian	5	–	3	–	0	6	–	4	–	0
Mississippi Southern	3	–	2	–	0	7	–	4	–	0
Louisiana Tech	3	–	2	–	0	6	–	4	–	0
West Tennessee State Teachers	4	–	3	–	0	5	–	5	–	0
Morehead State	1	–	1	–	2	3	–	3	–	2
Wofford	2	–	2	–	1	3	–	4	–	2
Middle Tennessee State Teachers	2	–	4	–	0	4	–	4	–	0
Tampa	2	–	4	–	0	3	–	6	–	0
Oglethorpe	2	–	4	–	0	2	–	6	–	0
Tennessee Tech	1	–	2	–	0	2	–	6	–	0
Transylvania	1	–	2	–	1	5	–	3	–	1
Stetson	2	–	5	–	1	2	–	5	–	1
Troy State	1	–	3	–	0	3	–	6	–	0
Louisiana College	1	–	4	–	2	2	–	5	–	2
Union (KY)	0	–	1	–	1	5	–	1	–	1
Centenary	0	–	2	–	0	3	–	7	–	0
Louisville	0	–	2	–	0	3	–	5	–	1
Jacksonville State	0	–	2	–	0	3	–	5	–	0
Erskine	0	–	5	–	0	1	–	8	–	0
Delta State	0	–	5	–	1	0	–	8	–	2
$ – Conference champion

The 1940 Oglethorpe Stormy Petrels football team represented Oglethorpe University in the sport of American football as a member of the Southern Intercollegiate Athletic Association (SIAA) during the 1940 college football season. This was the last large team from Oglethorpe before the war drafted so many students. Despite doing poorly, they had a strong schedule for an independent team. Practices were conducted at the North Fulton High School's field.

== Schedule ==
Date	Time	Opponent	Site	Result	Attendance	Source
September 27		Georgia*	Ponce de Leon Park; Atlanta, GA	L 0–53	25,000	
October 4		Wofford	Hermance Stadium; North Atlanta, GA	L 14–26		
October 12		at Troy State	Pace Field; Troy, AL	W 20–7	1,400	
October 25		at The Citadel*	Johnson Hagood Stadium; Charleston, SC	L 0–25	4,000	
November 2	2:15 p.m.	Newberry^{†}	Hermance Stadium; North Atlanta, GA	L 7–28		
November 8		at Tampa	Phillips Field; Tampa, FL	L 0–52		
November 21		at Erskine	Anderson, SC	W 28–0	2,000	
November 29	2:15 p.m.	Presbyterian	Hermance Stadium; North Atlanta, GA	L 6–20		
*Non-conference game; ^{†}Homecoming; All times are in Eastern time
