= 1940 Louisiana Tech Bulldogs football team =

American college football season

1940 Louisiana Tech Bulldogs football
- Conference: Louisiana Intercollegiate Conference, Southern Intercollegiate Athletic Association
- Record: 6–4 (3–2 LIC, 3–2 SIAA)
- Head coach: Joe Aillet (1st season)
- Captain: Pickle Vise

1940 Louisiana Intercollegiate Conference football standings
| | Conf. | | | | | Overall |
| Team | W | | L | | T | W | | L | | T |
|---|---|---|---|---|---|---|---|---|---|---|
| Southwestern Louisiana $ | 4 | – | 0 | – | 0 | 6 | – | 3 | – | 1 |
| Louisiana Normal | 3 | – | 1 | – | 1 | 6 | – | 3 | – | 1 |
| Louisiana Tech | 3 | – | 2 | – | 0 | 6 | – | 4 | – | 0 |
| Louisiana College | 0 | – | 2 | – | 1 | 2 | – | 5 | – | 2 |
| Centenary | 0 | – | 2 | – | 0 | 3 | – | 7 | – | 0 |
| Southeastern Louisiana | 0 | – | 3 | – | 0 | 3 | – | 6 | – | 1 |
$ – Conference champion

1940 Southern Intercollegiate Athletic Association football standings
| | Conf. | | | | | Overall |
| Team | W | | L | | T | W | | L | | T |
|---|---|---|---|---|---|---|---|---|---|---|
| Rollins $ | 6 | – | 0 | – | 0 | 8 | – | 1 | – | 0 |
| Newberry | 4 | – | 0 | – | 0 | 7 | – | 2 | – | 1 |
| Mississippi College | 2 | – | 0 | – | 0 | 5 | – | 1 | – | 1 |
| Eastern Kentucky | 1 | – | 0 | – | 0 | 8 | – | 0 | – | 0 |
| Western Kentucky State Teachers | 4 | – | 1 | – | 1 | 7 | – | 1 | – | 1 |
| Louisiana Normal | 4 | – | 1 | – | 1 | 6 | – | 3 | – | 1 |
| SW Louisiana | 4 | – | 1 | – | 0 | 6 | – | 3 | – | 1 |
| Union (TN) | 3 | – | 1 | – | 0 | 6 | – | 3 | – | 0 |
| Georgetown (KY) | 2 | – | 1 | – | 0 | 5 | – | 3 | – | 2 |
| Murray State | 4 | – | 2 | – | 1 | 4 | – | 3 | – | 2 |
| Centre | 2 | – | 1 | – | 0 | 3 | – | 6 | – | 0 |
| Miami (FL) | 2 | – | 1 | – | 0 | 3 | – | 7 | – | 0 |
| Presbyterian | 5 | – | 3 | – | 0 | 6 | – | 4 | – | 0 |
| Mississippi Southern | 3 | – | 2 | – | 0 | 7 | – | 4 | – | 0 |
| Louisiana Tech | 3 | – | 2 | – | 0 | 6 | – | 4 | – | 0 |
| West Tennessee State Teachers | 4 | – | 3 | – | 0 | 5 | – | 5 | – | 0 |
| Morehead State | 1 | – | 1 | – | 2 | 3 | – | 3 | – | 2 |
| Wofford | 2 | – | 2 | – | 1 | 3 | – | 4 | – | 2 |
| Middle Tennessee State Teachers | 2 | – | 4 | – | 0 | 4 | – | 4 | – | 0 |
| Tampa | 2 | – | 4 | – | 0 | 3 | – | 6 | – | 0 |
| Oglethorpe | 2 | – | 4 | – | 0 | 2 | – | 6 | – | 0 |
| Tennessee Tech | 1 | – | 2 | – | 0 | 2 | – | 6 | – | 0 |
| Transylvania | 1 | – | 2 | – | 1 | 5 | – | 3 | – | 1 |
| Stetson | 2 | – | 5 | – | 1 | 2 | – | 5 | – | 1 |
| Troy State | 1 | – | 3 | – | 0 | 3 | – | 6 | – | 0 |
| Louisiana College | 1 | – | 4 | – | 2 | 2 | – | 5 | – | 2 |
| Union (KY) | 0 | – | 1 | – | 1 | 5 | – | 1 | – | 1 |
| Centenary | 0 | – | 2 | – | 0 | 3 | – | 7 | – | 0 |
| Louisville | 0 | – | 2 | – | 0 | 3 | – | 5 | – | 1 |
| Jacksonville State | 0 | – | 2 | – | 0 | 3 | – | 5 | – | 0 |
| Erskine | 0 | – | 5 | – | 0 | 1 | – | 8 | – | 0 |
| Delta State | 0 | – | 5 | – | 1 | 0 | – | 8 | – | 2 |
$ – Conference champion

The 1940 Louisiana Tech Bulldogs football team was an American football team that represented the Louisiana Polytechnic Institute (now known as Louisiana Tech University) as a member of the Louisiana Intercollegiate Conference (LIC) and the Southern Intercollegiate Athletic Association (SIAA) during the 1940 college football season. In their first year under head coach Joe Aillet, the Bulldogs compiled an overall record of 6–4 with 3–2 marks in both LIC and SIAA play.

Louisiana Tech was ranked at No. 148 (out of 697 college football teams) in the final rankings under the Litkenhous Difference by Score system for 1940.

== Schedule ==
| Date | Time | Opponent | Site | Result | Attendance | Source |
|---|---|---|---|---|---|---|
| September 21 | | at LSU* | Tiger Stadium; Baton Rouge, LA | L 7–39 | | |
| September 26 | | vs. Ouachita Baptist* | Rowland Field; El Dorado, AR | L 0–17 | 3,000 | |
| October 4 | | Texas Mines* | Tech Stadium; Ruston, LA | W 19–7 | | |
| October 11 | | Western Kentucky | Tech Stadium; Ruston, LA | W 7–6 | | |
| October 19 | 2:30 p.m. | vs. Louisiana Normal | State Fair Stadium; Shreveport, LA (rivalry) | L 0–13 | 7,500 | |
| October 25 | | Illinois Wesleyan* | Tech Stadium; Ruston, LA | W 20–14 | | |
| November 1 | | at Southwestern Louisiana | McNaspy Stadium; Lafayette, LA (rivaly) | L 6–7 | 5,000 | |
| November 9 | | Louisiana College^{†} | Tech Stadium; Ruston, LA | W 15–0 | | |
| November 15 | | Southeastern Louisiana | Tech Stadium; Ruston, LA | W 26–6 | | |
| November 28 | | at Centenary | Centenary Stadium; Shreveport, LA | W 6–0 | 5,000 | |
*Non-conference game; ^{†}Homecoming; All times are in Central time
