= 1940 Union (Tennessee) Bulldogs football team =

American college football season

1940 Union (Tennessee) Bulldogs football
- Conference: Southern Intercollegiate Athletic Association
- Record: 6–3 (3–1 SIAA)
- Head coach: Fred DeLay (4th season)
- Home stadium: Rothrock Field

1940 Southern Intercollegiate Athletic Association football standings
	Conf.					Overall
Team	W		L		T	W		L		T
Rollins $	6	–	0	–	0	8	–	1	–	0
Newberry	4	–	0	–	0	7	–	2	–	1
Mississippi College	2	–	0	–	0	5	–	1	–	1
Eastern Kentucky	1	–	0	–	0	8	–	0	–	0
Western Kentucky State Teachers	4	–	1	–	1	7	–	1	–	1
Louisiana Normal	4	–	1	–	1	6	–	3	–	1
SW Louisiana	4	–	1	–	0	6	–	3	–	1
Union (TN)	3	–	1	–	0	6	–	3	–	0
Georgetown (KY)	2	–	1	–	0	5	–	3	–	2
Murray State	4	–	2	–	1	4	–	3	–	2
Centre	2	–	1	–	0	3	–	6	–	0
Miami (FL)	2	–	1	–	0	3	–	7	–	0
Presbyterian	5	–	3	–	0	6	–	4	–	0
Mississippi Southern	3	–	2	–	0	7	–	4	–	0
Louisiana Tech	3	–	2	–	0	6	–	4	–	0
West Tennessee State Teachers	4	–	3	–	0	5	–	5	–	0
Morehead State	1	–	1	–	2	3	–	3	–	2
Wofford	2	–	2	–	1	3	–	4	–	2
Middle Tennessee State Teachers	2	–	4	–	0	4	–	4	–	0
Tampa	2	–	4	–	0	3	–	6	–	0
Oglethorpe	2	–	4	–	0	2	–	6	–	0
Tennessee Tech	1	–	2	–	0	2	–	6	–	0
Transylvania	1	–	2	–	1	5	–	3	–	1
Stetson	2	–	5	–	1	2	–	5	–	1
Troy State	1	–	3	–	0	3	–	6	–	0
Louisiana College	1	–	4	–	2	2	–	5	–	2
Union (KY)	0	–	1	–	1	5	–	1	–	1
Centenary	0	–	2	–	0	3	–	7	–	0
Louisville	0	–	2	–	0	3	–	5	–	1
Jacksonville State	0	–	2	–	0	3	–	5	–	0
Erskine	0	–	5	–	0	1	–	8	–	0
Delta State	0	–	5	–	1	0	–	8	–	2
$ – Conference champion

The 1940 Union Bulldogs football team was an American football team that represented Union University of Jackson, Tennessee, as a member of the Southern Intercollegiate Athletic Association (SIAA) during the 1940 college football season. Led by fourth-year Fred DeLay head coach, the Bulldogs compiled a record of 6–3 with a mark of 3–1 in conference play.

== Schedule ==
Date	Time	Opponent	Site	Result	Source
September 21	2:30 p.m.	at Ole Miss*	Hemingway Stadium; Oxford, MS	L 0–37	
September 26	8:00 p.m.	Austin Peay*	Rothrock Field; Jackson, TN	W 28–0	
October 10		Southwestern (TN)*	Rothrock Field; Jackson, TN	L 6–27	
October 18		Delta State	Rothrock Field; Jackson, TN	W 41–0	
October 25		Murray State	Rothrock Field; Jackson, TN	L 11–14	
November 2		at Arkansas State*	Kays Stadium; Jonesboro, AR	W 0–20	
November 7		Middle Tennessee State Teachers^{†}	Rothrock Field; Jackson, TN	W 13–0	
November 15		at Cumberland (TN)*	Lebanon, TN	W 20–0	
November 26	8:00 p.m.	at West Tennessee State	Fairgrounds Stadium; Memphis, TN	W 22–6	
*Non-conference game; ^{†}Homecoming; All times are in Central time
