= Don Ridler =

American football player and coach (1909–1963)

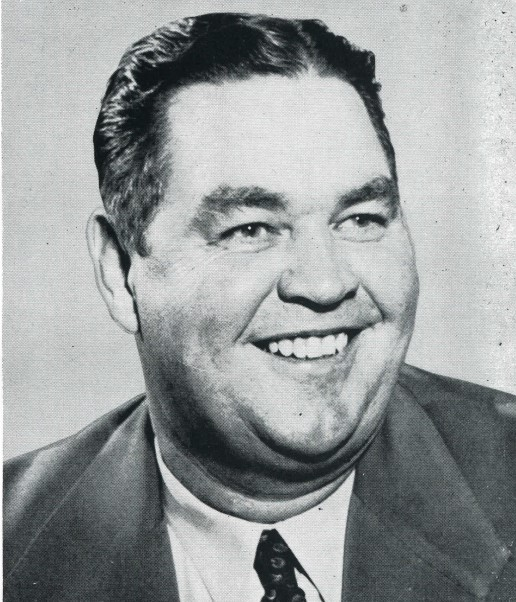
- Ridler in 1951

No. 52
- Position: Tackle

Personal information
- Born: April 2, 1909; Detroit, Michigan, U.S.
- Died: June 4, 1963 (aged 54); Novi, Michigan, U.S.
- Listed height: 6 ft 0 in (1.83 m)
- Listed weight: 210 lb (95 kg)

Career information
- College: Michigan State

Career history

Playing
- Cleveland Indians (1931)

Coaching
- Lawrence Tech (1938–1946) Head coach

Operations
- Lawrence Tech (1938–1963) Athletic director
- Stats at Pro Football Reference

Donald George Ridler (April 2, 1909 – June 4, 1963) was an American football player, coach, and athletics administrator. He played college football for Michigan State College (later known as Michigan State University) and professionally in the National Football League (NFL) for the Cleveland Indians during the 1931 season. He later became the football coach and athletic director at Lawrence Technological University. He remained the athletic director at Lawrence Tech for 25 years. He also served as the school's basketball coach starting in the mid-1940s and led the team to the 1951 National Invitation Tournament.

Ridler served as entertainment director for the Michigan State Fair from 1950 to 1962. He died at his home in Novi, Michigan, in 1963 at age 54.

== Head coaching record ==
=== Football ===
Year	Team	Overall	Conference	Standing	Bowl/playoffs
Lawrence Tech Blue Devils (Michigan-Ontario Collegiate Conference) (1938–1941)
1938	Lawrence Tech	3–4	3–0	1st	
1939	Lawrence Tech	4–4	2–2	T–2nd	
1940	Lawrence Tech	6–3	3–1	T–1st	
1941	Lawrence Tech	3–3		1st	
Lawrence Tech Blue Devils (Independent) (1946)
1946	Lawrence Tech	4–3–2			
Lawrence Tech:		20–17–2			
Total:		20–17–2			
National championship Conference title Conference division title or championship game berth
