= Henry Redd =

American football player and coach, basketball coach

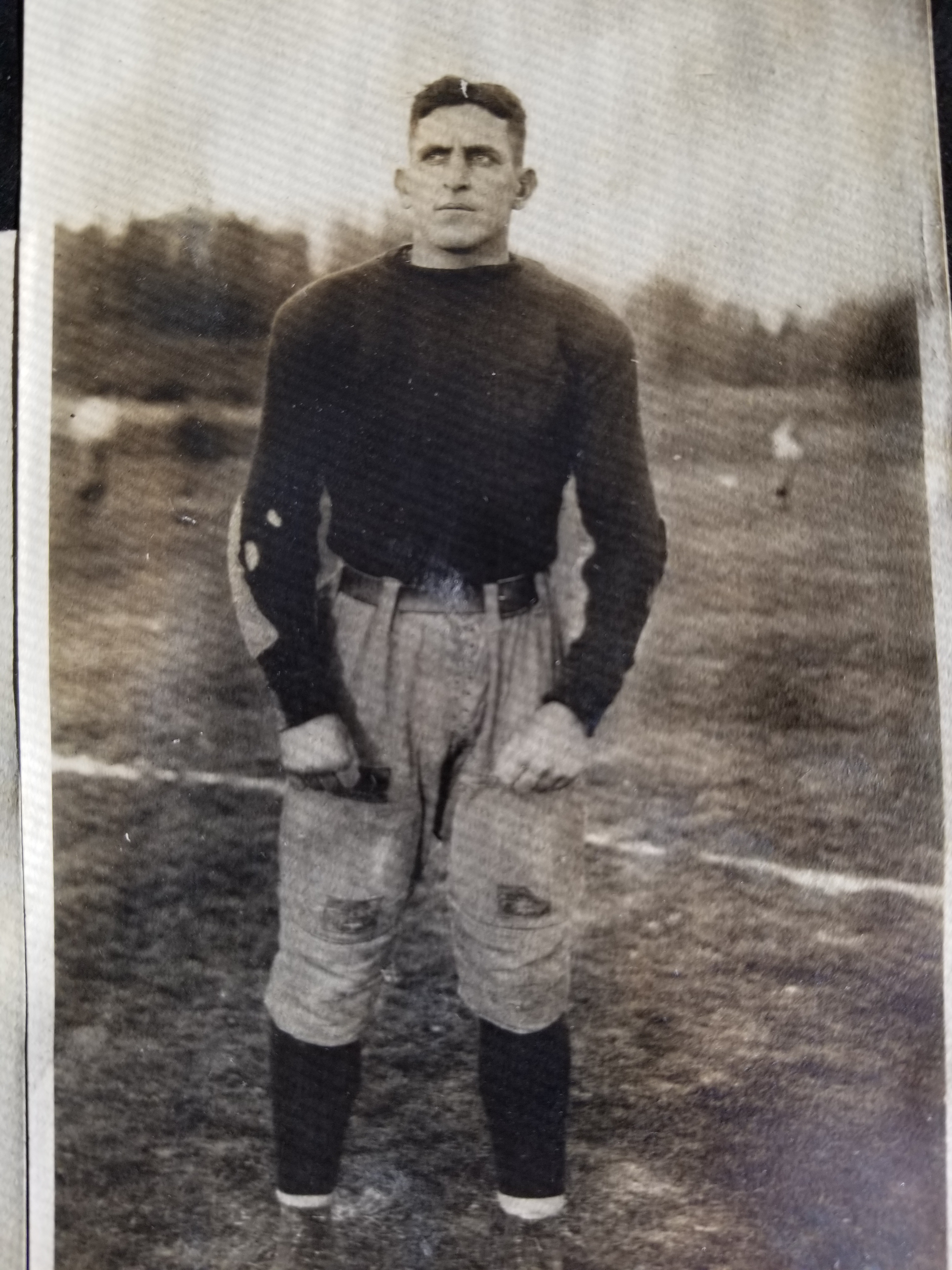

Biographical details
- Born: January 22, 1895; Martinsville, Virginia, U.S.
- Died: January 1, 1960 (aged 64); Blacksburg, Virginia, U.S.

Playing career

Football
- 1915–1916: VPI
- 1919–1920: VPI
- Position: Fullback

Coaching career (HC unless noted)

Football
- 1926–1931: VPI (freshmen)
- 1932–1940: VPI

Basketball
- 1926–1927: VPI

Head coaching record
- Overall: 43–37–8 (football); 6–8 (basketball)

Henry Barksdale "Puss" Redd (January 22, 1895 – January 1, 1960) was head football coach at Virginia Agricultural and Mechanical College and Polytechnic Institute (VPI)—now Virginia Tech—from 1932 to 1940. He also served as the school's men's basketball head coach for one season in 1926–27. Redd played college football for Tech in 1916 and 1917 before entering active service in World War I as a lieutenant in the artillery. He reentered school after the war and played again on the 1919 and 1920 teams, serving as captain for the 1920 season. He graduated in 1921. He was inducted into the Virginia Tech Sports Hall of Fame in 1985.

== Head coaching record ==
=== Football ===
Year	Team	Overall	Conference	Standing	Bowl/playoffs
VPI Gobblers (Southern Conference) (1932–1940)
1932	VPI	8–1	6–1	4th	
1933	VPI	4–3–3	1–1–3	T–5th	
1934	VPI	5–5	3–3	6th	
1935	VPI	4–3–2	3–3–1	T–5th	
1936	VPI	5–5	3–5	11th	
1937	VPI	5–5	2–4	12th	
1938	VPI	3–5–2	2–3–2	10th	
1939	VPI	4–5–1	1–4–1	12th	
1940	VPI	5–5	2–3	10th	
VPI:		43–37–8	23–27–7		
Total:		43–37–8			
