= 1940 VPI Gobblers football team =

American college football season

1940 VPI Gobblers football
- Conference: Southern Conference
- Record: 5–5 (2–3 SoCon)
- Head coach: Henry Redd (9th season)
- Captains: Jim Coleman; John Henderson
- Home stadium: Miles Stadium

1940 Southern Conference football standings
	Conf.					Overall
Team	W		L		T	W		L		T
Clemson $	4	–	0	–	0	6	–	2	–	1
No. 18 Duke	4	–	1	–	0	7	–	2	–	0
Wake Forest	4	–	2	–	0	7	–	3	–	0
William & Mary	2	–	1	–	1	6	–	2	–	1
North Carolina	3	–	2	–	0	6	–	4	–	0
Richmond	3	–	2	–	0	7	–	3	–	0
VMI	3	–	2	–	1	7	–	2	–	1
Furman	4	–	3	–	0	5	–	4	–	0
Washington and Lee	1	–	1	–	1	2	–	7	–	1
VPI	2	–	3	–	0	5	–	5	–	0
NC State	3	–	5	–	0	3	–	6	–	0
Maryland	0	–	1	–	1	2	–	6	–	1
South Carolina	1	–	3	–	0	3	–	6	–	0
Davidson	1	–	5	–	0	5	–	5	–	0
The Citadel	0	–	4	–	0	4	–	5	–	0
$ – Conference champion; Rankings from AP Poll

The 1940 VPI Gobblers football team represented Virginia Agricultural and Mechanical College and Polytechnic Institute in the 1940 college football season. The team was led by their head coach Henry Redd and finished with a record of five wins and five losses (5–5).

VPI was ranked at No. 98 (out of 697 college football teams) in the final rankings under the Litkenhous Difference by Score system for 1940.

== Schedule ==
Date	Time	Opponent	Site	Result	Attendance	Source
September 21		Catawba*	Miles Stadium; Blacksburg, VA	W 34–12	3,000	
September 28		at Marshall*	Fairfield Stadium; Huntington, WV	L 7–13	8,000	
October 5	3:00 p.m.	Richmond^{†}	Miles Stadium; Blacksburg, VA	L 7–13	6,000	
October 12	2:30 p.m.	vs. William & Mary	City Stadium; Richmond, VA	L 13–20	9,000	
October 18	8:30 p.m.	at Georgetown*	Griffith Stadium; Washington, DC	L 4–46	15,000	
October 26	2:30 p.m.	vs. Washington and Lee	Lynchburg Municipal Stadium; Lynchburg, VA	W 21–0	6,000-6,500	
November 2		vs. Virginia*	Foreman Field; Norfolk, VA (rivalry)	W 6–0	9,000	
November 9	2:30 p.m.	Furman	Miles Stadium; Blacksburg, VA	W 38–21	4,000	
November 16	2:00 p.m.	at Centre*	Farris Stadium; Danville, KY	W 10–6	4,000	
November 21	2:15 p.m.	vs. VMI	Maher Field; Roanoke, VA (rivalry)	L 0–14	20,000-21,000	
*Non-conference game; ^{†}Homecoming; All times are in Eastern time

== Before the season ==
The 1939 VPI Gobblers football team compiled a 4–5–1 record and were led by Henry Redd in his eighth season as head coach.

In December 1939, the VPI letterwinners chose linemen Jim Coleman and John Henderson as co-captains for the 1940 football season.

== Game summaries ==
=== Catawba ===
Catawba at VPI

Team	1	2	3	4	Total
Catawba	0	6	6	0	12
• VPI	0	20	7	7	34

- Date: September 21, 1940
- Location: Miles Stadium
  Blacksburg, VA
- Game attendance: 3,000
- Referee: Richard Carrington (UVA)

VPI's first game of the season was a victory over Catawba at Miles Stadium.

The starting lineup for VPI was: Lawson (left end), Coleman (left tackle), W. Tate (left guard), Zydiak (center), McClure (right guard), Judy (right tackle), J. Henderson (right end), Kern (quarterback), Thomas (left halfback), James (right halfback), Hudson (fullback). The substitutes were: Anderson, Belcher, Blandford, Chasen, Clark, Graves, Johnson, Morehead, Rucker, Sedwick, Smith, Strieff, Sullivan, B. Tate, Todd, Traynham, Unterzuber, Warriner and Wheeler.

The starting lineup for Catawba was: Leo Morgan (left end), George Haley (left tackle), Hubert Menapace (left guard), Ed Ellis (center), Chub Richards (right guard), Bill Self (right tackle), Handley (right end), Ike Green (quarterback), Dwight Holshouser (left halfback), Culton (right halfback), Crayton Benson, Jr. (fullback). The substitutes were: Duke Burkholder, Capaccio, Clayton Gaddy, Steve Johnson, Levich, Morehead, Ranaschire, William Rodeffer, Dave Staley, Todderd, Army Tomaini, Werner and Wright.

=== Marshall ===
VPI at Marshall

Team	1	2	3	4	Total
VPI	0	0	0	7	7
• Marshall	0	6	0	7	13

- Date: September 28, 1940
- Location: Fairfield Stadium
  Huntington, WV
- Game attendance: 8,000

After their victory over Catawba, VPI played Marshall College at Fairfield Stadium in Huntington, West Virginia.

The starting lineup for VPI was: Lawson (left end), Coleman (left tackle), McClure (left guard), Zydiak (center), W. Tate (right guard), Judy (right tackle), Henderson (right end), Kern (quarterback), Thomas (left halfback), Wheeler (right halfback), Hudson (fullback). The substitutes were: Warriner.

The starting lineup for Marshall was: Jack Mattiford (left end), Stan Huffman (left tackle), Frank Mellie (left guard), Jim Roberts (center), Harry Clagg (right guard), Harold Cox (right tackle), Ed Ulinski (right end), Lorin Daniels (quarterback), Jackie Hunt (left halfback), Harley Kuhl (right halfback), Okey Lucas (fullback). The substitutes were: Andy D'Antoni and Jack Peters.

=== Richmond ===
Richmond at VPI

Team	1	2	3	4	Total
• Richmond	6	7	0	0	13
VPI	7	0	0	0	7

- Date: October 5, 1940
- Location: Miles Stadium
  Blacksburg, VA
- Game start: 3:00 p.m.
- Game attendance: 6,000
- Game weather: "Pleasant"
- Referee: Richard Carrington (UVA)

VPI's 1940 homecoming game was a loss to Richmond.

The starting lineup for VPI was: Clark (left end), Coleman (left tackle), W. Tate (left guard), Zydiak (center), Graves (right guard), Judy (right tackle), Henderson (right end), Thomas (quarterback), Wheeler (left halfback), Kern (right halfback), Hudson (fullback). The substitutes were: Anderson, Belcher, Chasen, James, Lawson, McClure, Morehead, Smith, Sullivan, Todd, Unterzuber, Warriner and Woolwine.

The starting lineup for Richmond was: Dick Humbert (left end), Harold McVay (left tackle), Bert Milling (left guard), William Fitzhugh (center), Andy Fronczek (right guard), David Robertson (right tackle), Robert Erickson (right end), Art Jones (quarterback), Butcher (left halfback), Frank Baker (right halfback), Warren Pace (fullback). The substitutes were: Joseph Amrhein, Coxey Bowen, Vincent Collins, Lemuel Fitzgerald, John Griffin, Maxwell Katz, Joseph Mack, Moore and Gordon ReMine.

=== William & Mary ===
William & Mary vs. VPI

Team	1	2	3	4	Total
• W&M	7	7	6	0	20
VPI	7	0	0	6	13

- Date: October 12, 1940
- Location: City Stadium
  Richmond, VA
- Game attendance: 9,000
- Referee: Paul Magoffin

The starting lineup for VPI was: Lawson (left end), Todd (left tackle), W. Tate (left guard), Zydiak (center), McClure (right guard), Belcher (right tackle), Henderson (right end), Kern (quarterback), Thomas (left halfback), Wheeler (right halfback), Warriner (fullback). The substitutes were: Anderson, Blandford, Chasen, Clark, Graves, Hudson, James, Johnson, Lawson, John Smith, Streiff, Sullivan, B. Tate, Unterzuber and Woolwine.

The starting lineup for William & Mary was: Charles Gondak (left end), Cary Berry (left tackle), Buster Ramsey (left guard), William Goodlow (center), Ed Goodlow (right guard), Marvin Bass (right tackle), Alphonse Chestnut (right end), Waldo Matthews (quarterback), Harlie Masters (left halfback), Harold Fields (right halfback), Harvey Johnson (fullback). The substitutes were: Dick Adams, John Brodka, Abe Ferris, Glamini, Al Helsander, H. Hollingsworth, Jimmie Howard, Newell Irwin, Kickery, Glen Knox, John Korczowski, Al Vandeweghe and Hank Whitehouse.

=== Georgetown ===
VPI at Georgetown

Team	1	2	3	4	Total
VPI	0	2	0	2	4
• Georgetown	7	12	6	21	46

- Date: October 18, 1940
- Location: Griffith Stadium
  Washington, DC
- Game start: 8:30 p.m.
- Game attendance: 15,000
- Referee: J.R. Trimble (Duquesne)

The starting lineup for VPI was: Lawson (left end), Coleman (left tackle), W. Tate (left guard), Zydiak (center), Anderson (right guard), Belcher (right tackle), Henderson (right end), James (quarterback), Thomas (left halfback), Kern (right halfback), Warriner (fullback). The substitutes were: Blandford, Chasen, Clark, Hudson, Johnson, McClure, Smith, Sullivan, Taylor, Unterzuber and Wheeler.

The starting lineup for Georgetown was: Chris Pavich (left end), Earl Fullilove (left tackle), Marc Ostinato (left guard), Bill Erickson (center), Angelo Paternoster (right guard), Joe Daniels (right tackle), John Lascari (right end), Joe McFadden (quarterback), Julius Koshlap (left halfback), Lou Ghecas (right halfback), John Barrett (fullback). The substitutes were: Al Blozis, Ben Bulvin, Jack Doolan, Frank Dornfield, Louis P. Falcone, Al Kull, Art Lemke, Augie Lio, Al Lujack, Al Matuza, Bill McLaughlin, Edward Joseph McMahon, Dominick Montanero, Bill Nealon, George Perpich, James Reichey, Russ Sorce, Jack Spencer and Dave Wiley.

=== Washington and Lee ===
Washington & Lee vs. VPI

Team	1	2	3	4	Total
W&L	0	0	0	0	0
• VPI	0	7	7	7	21

- Date: October 26, 1940
- Location: Lynchburg Municipal Stadium
  Lynchburg, VA
- Game start: 2:30 p.m.
- Game attendance: 6,000-6,500

The starting lineup for VPI was: Sullivan (left end), W. Tate (left tackle), McClure (left guard), Zydiak (center), Anderson (right guard), Belcher (right tackle), Henderson (right end), Kern (quarterback), Thomas (left halfback), Smith (right halfback), Warriner (fullback). The substitutes were: Hudson, James, Lawson and Wheeler.

The starting lineup for Washington & Lee was: Taylor Truehart (left end), Sanders Simmons (left tackle), Stephen Hanasik (left guard), John "Jack" Mangan (center), Francis Bryan (right guard), John Rulevich (right tackle), Courtney Wadlington (right end), Joe Baugher (quarterback), Preston Brown (left halfback), Robert "Bob" Pinck (right halfback), Alfred "Junie" Bishop (fullback). The substitutes were: John Ligon.

=== Virginia ===
Virginia vs. VPI

Team	1	2	3	4	Total
UVA	0	0	0	0	0
• VPI	0	6	0	0	6

- Date: November 2, 1940
- Location: Foreman Field
  Norfolk, VA
- Game attendance: 9,000
- Game weather: "Warm indian summer sun"
- Referee: Causey (South Carolina)

The starting lineup for VPI was: Sullivan (left end), W. Tate (left tackle), McClure (left guard), Zydiak (center), Anderson (right guard), Belcher (right tackle), Henderson (right end), Kern (quarterback), Thomas (left halfback), Smith (right halfback), Warriner (fullback). The substitutes were: Clark, Hudson, McKinney, Morehead, James and Wheeler.

The starting lineup for Virginia was: White (left end), Harbinson (left tackle), Dickey (left guard), William Suhling III (center), John Sauerbeck (right guard), Morse (right tackle), Nick Gianakos (right end), Bill Dudley (quarterback), Bryant (left halfback), Crenshaw (right halfback), Cardozo (fullback). The substitutes were: Abbott, Aldrich, Goodwin, Gravatt, William Hill, Lee McLaughlin, Mirman, Murden, Leroy Neustedter, O'Grince, William Preston, Schlesinger and Waldrop.

=== Furman ===
Furman at VPI

Team	1	2	3	4	Total
Furman	0	14	0	7	21
• VPI	14	7	7	10	38

- Date: November 9, 1940
- Location: Miles Stadium
  Blacksburg, VA
- Game start: 2:30 p.m.
- Game attendance: 4,000
- Game weather: "crisp, sunny weather"
- Referee: Ervin (Drake)

The starting lineup for VPI was: Clark (left end), W. Tate (left tackle), Anderson (left guard), Zydiak (center), McClure (right guard), Belcher (right tackle), J. Henderson (right end), Wheeler (quarterback), Kern (left halfback), Thomas (right halfback), Warriner (fullback). The substitutes were: Chasen, Graves, Hudson, James, Morehead, Rucker, Smith, Streiff, B. Tate and Unterzuber.

The starting lineup for Furman was: William Seel (left end), Bill Cornwall (left tackle), Charles Edens (left guard), Bill Brubeck (center), Gates Barker (right guard), James McQueen (right tackle), Harold Mann (right end), Robert Fitzer (quarterback), Wallace Brubeck (left halfback), Ralph Hamer (right halfback), Dewey Proctor (fullback). The substitutes were: Jim Barnett, Junior Boles, Lynn Culbertson, Orvell Duncan, Lawrence Farry, Hicks, Waldo Hinson, Ralph Hodgson, George Lovell, Merrill McDaniel, Merritt Morris, Paul Sizemore, Ralph Trabakino and George Turner.

=== Centre ===
Centre vs. VPI

Team	1	2	3	4	Total
Centre	6	0	0	0	6
• VPI	7	0	0	3	10

- Date: November 16, 1940
- Location: Farris Stadium
  Danville, KY
- Game attendance: 4,000
- Game weather: "Freezing temperature and high wind"
- Referee: Stanley Bach (Kentucky)

The starting lineup for VPI was: Clark (left end), W. Tate (left tackle), Anderson (left guard), Zydiak (center), McClure (right guard), Belcher (right tackle), J. Henderson (right end), Wheeler (quarterback), Kern (left halfback), Thomas (right halfback), Warriner (fullback). The substitutes were: Hudson.

The starting lineup for Centre was: Schultz (left end), James Campbell (left tackle), Skovron (left guard), William Hale (center), Jim Brakefield (right guard), Felchner (right tackle), Arnold Amundsen (right end), William Yates (quarterback), Stan Czekala (left halfback), Jack Haddock (right halfback), Smith (fullback).

=== VMI ===
VMI vs. VPI

Team	1	2	3	4	Total
• VMI	0	7	0	7	14
VPI	0	0	0	0	0

- Date: November 21, 1940
- Location: Maher Field
  Roanoke, VA
- Game start: 2:15 p.m.
- Game attendance: 20,000-21,000
- Game weather: "Half-way decent for a change, though a trifle on the warm side"

The starting lineup for VPI was: Clark (left end), W. Tate (left tackle), Anderson (left guard), Zydiak (center), McClure (right guard), Belcher (right tackle), Henderson (right end), Wheeler (quarterback), Kern (left halfback), Thomas (right halfback), Warriner (fullback). The substitutes were: Chasen, Graves, Hudson, Johnson, Morehead, Smith and Unterzuber.

The starting lineup for VMI was: Luther Sexton (left end), Andrew Nelson (left tackle), Ray Reutt (left guard), Barney Skladany (center), Tom Thrasher (right guard), Harold Tipton (right tackle), Randolph Huyett (right end), Abisha "Bosh" Pritchard (quarterback), Carter Catlett (left halfback), Joe Muha (right halfback), Byron Walker (fullback). The substitutes were: Billy Clark, Clyde Ellington, James Matthews, William Nugent, Roy Replogle, James "Son" Shelby, Emil Sotnyk, William Walker and Gerald Williams.

== After the season ==
On November 20, 1940, Henry Redd announced that he would resign as VPI head coach to become full-time secretary of the General Alumni Association and the director of the Tech Alumni Fund. After considering other coaches to fill the vacancy (reportedly including Bunny Oakes and John Barnhill), former Rice head coach Jimmy Kitts accepted the VPI head coaching position on February 13, 1941.

In December 1940, the VPI letterwinners chose linemen Bill Tate and Bill Zydiak as co-captains for the 1941 football season.

== Players ==
=== Roster ===
VPI 1940 roster
Van Anderson; Mason Harper Blandford; Alton Belcher; Bruce Brinkley; Richard Carpenter; Irvin Jean Chasen; Gerald Clark; William Claypool; Jim Coleman (Capt.); William Davis; Frank L. DeBord, Jr.; Paul Gowen, Jr.; Preston Graves; John Henderson (Capt.); Willard Joseph Henderson	Rankin Hudson; Bill James; William B. Johnson; Ben Judy; Dick Kern; Bob Lawson; Roger McClure; Charles Thomas McCurdy; Charles McKinney; Paul McMullin; Henry Morehead; John Rucker; Julian Sedwick; Joe Smith; John Smith	Frank Arthur Streiff; James Sullivan; Benjamin Tate; William "Bill" Tate; Garrett Taylor; Herbert Joseph Thomas; Andy Todd; Albert "Pete" Traynham; Ralph Unterzuber; Paul A. Warner; George Warriner; Gene Wheeler; Jimmy Woolwine; Bill Zydiak

=== Varsity letter winners ===
Twenty-four players received varsity letters for their participation on the 1940 VPI team.

Player	Hometown	Notes
Cecil Van Anderson	Andersonville, Virginia	World War II veteran (Major, Army Air Corps).
Alton Harwood Belcher	Petersburg, Virginia	World War II veteran (2nd Lieutenant, Army). Participated in D-Day, the liberation of Paris, and the Battle of the Bulge.
Gerald Harley Clark	Bristol, Tennessee	
James Emory Coleman (Capt.)	Fayetteville, West Virginia	
Robert Preston Graves	Salem, Virginia	World War II and Vietnam War veteran (Colonel, Army). Awarded the Bronze Star Medal.
John L. Henderson (Capt.)	Sevierville, Tennessee	
Rankin McGuire Hudson	Sweetwater, Tennessee	
William Wilson "Bill" James	Hampton, Virginia	World War II and Korean War veteran (1st Lieutenant, Army).
Samuel Benjamin Judy	Belleville, West Virginia	
Richard Davis Kern	Winchester, Virginia	World War II veteran (Major, Army). Awarded the Bronze Star Medal and Purple Heart.
Robert "Bob" Lawson	Cambria, Virginia	
Roger Nelson McClure	Glasgow, West Virginia	World War II veteran (Captain, Army).
Joseph Franklin Smith	Bristol, Virginia	
John O. Smith	Beckley, West Virginia	
William Lee "Bill" Tate	Pulaski, Virginia	
Garrett Ernest Taylor	Victoria, Virginia	
Herbert Joseph Thomas	South Charleston, West Virginia	World War II veteran (Sergeant, Marines). Awarded the Medal of Honor.
Andrew Wellington Todd	Hampton, Virginia	World War II veteran (Army).
Albert Crawford "Pete" Traynham	Richmond, Virginia	
Ralph Travis Unterzuber	Belmont, Ohio	World War II veteran (Army).
George Daniel Warriner	Montgomery County, Virginia	World War II veteran (Captain, Army). Awarded the Bronze Star Medal and Purple Heart.
Eugene Hagy Wheeler	Big Stone Gap, Virginia	World War II veteran (Army).
James Walter Woolwine, Jr.	Giles County, Virginia	World War II veteran (Navy).
William Daniel Zydiak	Manville, New Jersey	

== Coaching and training staff ==
- Head coach: Henry Redd
- Assistant coaches
  - Backfield coach: Herbert McEver
  - Line coach: Sumner D. Tilson
- Freshman coaches
  - Freshman head coach: Red Laird
  - Freshman line coach: John Kellison
  - Assistant freshman coach and trainer: Willard D. Altman
