= 1940 Lawrence Tech Blue Devils football team =

American college football season

1940 Lawrence Tech Blue Devils football

MOCC co-champion
- Conference: Michigan-Ontario Collegiate Conference
- Record: 6–3 (3–1 MOCC)
- Head coach: Don Ridler (3rd season)
- Home stadium: Ives Field

1940 Michigan-Ontario Collegiate Conference football standings
	Conf.					Overall
Team	W		L		T	W		L		T
Lawrence Tech +	3	–	1	–	0	6	–	3	–	0
Assumption (ON) +	3	–	1	–	0	?	–	?	–	?
DeSales (OH) +	3	–	1	–	0	4	–	4	–	0
St. Mary's (MI)	1	–	3	–	0	2	–	3	–	0
Ferris Institute	0	–	4	–	0	1	–	7	–	0
+ – Conference co-champions

The 1940 Lawrence Tech Blue Devils football team represented the Lawrence Institute of Technology of Highland Park, Michigan, as a member of the Michigan-Ontario Collegiate Conference (MOCC) during the 1940 college football season. In their third year under head coach Don Ridler, the Blue Devils compiled a 6–3 record, tied for the MOCC championship, and outscored opponents by a total of 147 to 96.

Five Lawrence Tech players were selected by conference coaches to the MOCC all-conference first team: end Fred Dupke; tackle Walter Nowacki; guard Al Schrecke; halfback Harry Awdey; and halfback Jackie Coogan.

Paul Ribbentrop, a cousin of Germany's Nazi foreign minister Joachim von Ribbentrop, played at the tackle position for the 1930 Lawrence Tech team.

== Schedule ==
Date	Opponent	Site	Result	Attendance	Source
September 20	at Hillsdale*	Hillsdale, MI	W 19–9		
September 28	at Indiana State*	Terre Haute, IN	L 7–20		
October 5	at Assumption (ON)	Kennedy Stadium; Windsor, OH	W 10–0	1,500	
October 12	Grand Rapids*	Ives Field; Highland Park, MI	W 27–12		
October 19	Ferris Institute	Big Rapids, MI	W 20–0	1,000	
October 26	Wittenberg*	Ives Field; Highland Park, MI	L 0–20		
November 2	St. Mary's (MI)	Ives Field; Highland Park, MI	W 31–0		
November 9	DeSales (OH)	Ives Field; Highland Park, MI	L 7–33	1,000	
November 16	at Defiance*	Defiance, OH	W 26–2		
*Non-conference game
