= 1940 Sam Houston State Bearkats football team =

American college football season

1940 Sam Houston State Bearkats football
- Conference: Lone Star Conference
- Record: 8–2 (3–1 LSC)
- Head coach: Puny Wilson (3rd season)
- Home stadium: Pritchett Field

1940 Lone Star Conference football standings
	Conf.					Overall
Team	W		L		T	W		L		T
North Texas State $	4	–	0	–	0	6	–	3	–	0
Sam Houston State	3	–	1	–	0	8	–	2	–	0
East Texas State	2	–	2	–	0	4	–	4	–	0
Stephen F. Austin	1	–	3	–	0	4	–	5	–	0
Southwest Texas State	0	–	4	–	0	3	–	5	–	1
$ – Conference champion

The 1940 Sam Houston State Bearkats football team represented Sam Houston State Teachers College (now known as Sam Houston State University) as a member of the Lone Star Conference (LSC) during the 1940 college football season. Led by third-year head coach Puny Wilson, the Bearkats compiled an overall record of 8–2 with a mark of 3–1 in conference play, and finished second in the LSC.

Sam Houston was ranked at No. 105 (out of 697 college football teams) in the final rankings under the Litkenhous Difference by Score system for 1940.

== Schedule ==
Date	Opponent	Site	Result	Source
September 21	at Trinity (TX)*	Waxahachie, TX	W 32–6	
September 28	Texas Wesleyan*	Pritchett Field; Huntsville, TX	W 6–2	
October 4	at Mississippi Southern*	Faulkner Field; Hattiesburg, MS	W 18–16	
October 12	Texas A&I*	Pritchett Field; Huntsville, TX	L 6–7	
October 17	vs. Southeastern Louisiana*	Purple Stadium; Beaumont, TX	W 22–12	
October 25	North Texas State	Pritchett Field; Huntsville, TX	L 6–7	
November 2	at East Texas State	Commerce, TX	W 19–9	
November 9	Lamar*	Pritchett Field; Huntsville, TX	W 37–0	
November 16	at Southwest Texas State	Evans Field; San Marcos, TX (rivalry)	W 19–12	
November 21	Stephen F. Austin	Pritchett Field; Huntsville, TX (rivalry)	W 27–7	
*Non-conference game
