= 1940 North Carolina Tar Heels football team =

American college football season

1940 North Carolina Tar Heels football
- Conference: Southern Conference
- Record: 6–4 (3–2 SoCon)
- Head coach: Raymond Wolf (5th season)
- Captains: Paul Severin; Gates Kimball
- Home stadium: Kenan Memorial Stadium

1940 Southern Conference football standings
	Conf.					Overall
Team	W		L		T	W		L		T
Clemson $	4	–	0	–	0	6	–	2	–	1
No. 18 Duke	4	–	1	–	0	7	–	2	–	0
Wake Forest	4	–	2	–	0	7	–	3	–	0
William & Mary	2	–	1	–	1	6	–	2	–	1
North Carolina	3	–	2	–	0	6	–	4	–	0
Richmond	3	–	2	–	0	7	–	3	–	0
VMI	3	–	2	–	1	7	–	2	–	1
Furman	4	–	3	–	0	5	–	4	–	0
Washington and Lee	1	–	1	–	1	2	–	7	–	1
VPI	2	–	3	–	0	5	–	5	–	0
NC State	3	–	5	–	0	3	–	6	–	0
Maryland	0	–	1	–	1	2	–	6	–	1
South Carolina	1	–	3	–	0	3	–	6	–	0
Davidson	1	–	5	–	0	5	–	5	–	0
The Citadel	0	–	4	–	0	4	–	5	–	0
$ – Conference champion; Rankings from AP Poll

The 1940 North Carolina Tar Heels football team represented the University of North Carolina at Chapel Hill during the 1940 college football season. The Tar Heels were led by fifth-year head coach Raymond Wolf and played their home games at Kenan Memorial Stadium. They competed as a member of the Southern Conference.

Paul Severin was selected as a first-team All-American end by the Associated Press for a second straight year, as well as by the NEA, Newsweek, and Football Digest. He is remembered for a game-saving tackle of Steve Lach in UNC's win against rival Duke.

North Carolina was ranked at No. 47 (out of 697 college football teams) in the final rankings under the Litkenhous Difference by Score system for 1940.

== Schedule ==
Date	Time	Opponent	Site	Result	Attendance	Source
September 21	2:30 p.m.	Appalachian State*	Kenan Memorial Stadium; Chapel Hill, NC	W 56–6		
September 28	2:30 p.m.	Wake Forest	Kenan Memorial Stadium; Chapel Hill, NC (rivalry)	L 0–12	21,000	
October 5	2:30 p.m.	vs. Davidson	Bowman Gray Stadium; Winston-Salem, NC	W 27–7	5,000	
October 12	2:00 p.m.	TCU*	Kenan Memorial Stadium; Chapel Hill, NC	W 21–14	19,000	
October 19	2:30 p.m.	at NC State	Riddick Stadium; Raleigh, NC (rivalry)	W 13–7	15,000	
October 26	2:00 p.m.	Tulane*	Kenan Memorial Stadium; Chapel Hill, NC	L 13–14	20,000	
November 2	2:00 p.m.	at Fordham*	Polo Grounds (IV); New York, NY	L 0–14	16,794	
November 9	2:30 p.m.	at Richmond	City Stadium; Richmond, VA	L 13–14	8,500	
November 16	2:00 p.m.	No. 12 Duke	Kenan Memorial Stadium; Chapel Hill, NC (rivalry)	W 6–3	41,000	
November 23	2:00 p.m.	at Virginia*	Scott Stadium; Charlottesville, VA (South's Oldest Rivalry)	W 10–7	12,000	
*Non-conference game; Rankings from AP Poll released prior to the game; All times are in Eastern time
