= 1940 VMI Keydets football team =

American college football season

1940 VMI Keydets football
- Conference: Southern Conference
- Record: 7–2–1 (3–2–1 SoCon)
- Head coach: Pooley Hubert (4th season)
- Home stadium: Alumni Field

1940 Southern Conference football standings
	Conf.					Overall
Team	W		L		T	W		L		T
Clemson $	4	–	0	–	0	6	–	2	–	1
No. 18 Duke	4	–	1	–	0	7	–	2	–	0
Wake Forest	4	–	2	–	0	7	–	3	–	0
William & Mary	2	–	1	–	1	6	–	2	–	1
North Carolina	3	–	2	–	0	6	–	4	–	0
Richmond	3	–	2	–	0	7	–	3	–	0
VMI	3	–	2	–	1	7	–	2	–	1
Furman	4	–	3	–	0	5	–	4	–	0
Washington and Lee	1	–	1	–	1	2	–	7	–	1
VPI	2	–	3	–	0	5	–	5	–	0
NC State	3	–	5	–	0	3	–	6	–	0
Maryland	0	–	1	–	1	2	–	6	–	1
South Carolina	1	–	3	–	0	3	–	6	–	0
Davidson	1	–	5	–	0	5	–	5	–	0
The Citadel	0	–	4	–	0	4	–	5	–	0
$ – Conference champion; Rankings from AP Poll

The 1940 VMI Keydets football team was an American football team that represented the Virginia Military Institute (VMI) during the 1940 college football season as a member of the Southern Conference. In their fourth year under head coach Pooley Hubert, the team compiled an overall record of 7–2–1.

VMI was ranked at No. 85 (out of 697 college football teams) in the final rankings under the Litkenhous Difference by Score system for 1940.

== Schedule ==
Date	Time	Opponent	Site	Result	Attendance	Source
September 21		Roanoke*	Alumni Field; Lexington, VA	W 33–0	4,500	
September 28		at Duke	Duke Stadium; Durham, NC	L 0–23	7,000	
October 5		Newberry*	Alumni Field; Lexington, VA	W 13–0	1,500	
October 12		at Davidson	American Legion Memorial Stadium; Charlotte, NC	W 13–7	7,000	
October 19		at Virginia*	Scott Stadium; Charlottesville, VA	W 7–0	18,000	
October 26		at Richmond	City Stadium; Richmond, VA (rivalry)	L 7–9	10,000	
November 2		William & Mary	Alumni Field; Lexington, VA (rivalry)	T 0–0	6,000	
November 9	3:00 p.m.	at Washington University*	Francis Field; St. Louis, MO	W 20–13	2,500	
November 16		vs. Maryland	City Stadium; Lynchburg, VA	W 20–0	1,500	
November 21	2:15 p.m.	vs. VPI	Maher Field; Roanoke, VA (rivalry)	W 14–0	21,000	
*Non-conference game; All times are in Eastern time
