= 1940 Davidson Wildcats football team =

American college football season

1940 Davidson Wildcats football
- Conference: Southern Conference
- Record: 5–5 (1–5 SoCon)
- Head coach: Gene McEver (5th season)
- Home stadium: Richardson Field

1940 Southern Conference football standings
	Conf.					Overall
Team	W		L		T	W		L		T
Clemson $	4	–	0	–	0	6	–	2	–	1
No. 18 Duke	4	–	1	–	0	7	–	2	–	0
Wake Forest	4	–	2	–	0	7	–	3	–	0
William & Mary	2	–	1	–	1	6	–	2	–	1
North Carolina	3	–	2	–	0	6	–	4	–	0
Richmond	3	–	2	–	0	7	–	3	–	0
VMI	3	–	2	–	1	7	–	2	–	1
Furman	4	–	3	–	0	5	–	4	–	0
Washington and Lee	1	–	1	–	1	2	–	7	–	1
VPI	2	–	3	–	0	5	–	5	–	0
NC State	3	–	5	–	0	3	–	6	–	0
Maryland	0	–	1	–	1	2	–	6	–	1
South Carolina	1	–	3	–	0	3	–	6	–	0
Davidson	1	–	5	–	0	5	–	5	–	0
The Citadel	0	–	4	–	0	4	–	5	–	0
$ – Conference champion; Rankings from AP Poll

The 1940 Davidson Wildcats football team was an American football team that represented Davidson College during the 1940 college football season as a member of the Southern Conference. In their fifth year under head coach Gene McEver, the team compiled an overall record of 5–5, with a mark of 1–5 in conference play, and finished in 14th place in the SoCon.

Davidson was ranked at No. 125 (out of 697 college football teams) in the final rankings under the Litkenhous Difference by Score system for 1940.

== Schedule ==
Date	Opponent	Site	Result	Attendance	Source
September 21	Rollins*	Richardson Field; Davidson, NC	W 19–7		
September 28	at NC State	Riddick Stadium; Raleigh, NC	L 0–34		
October 5	vs. North Carolina	Bowman Gray Stadium; Winston-Salem, NC	L 7–27	5,000	
October 12	vs. VMI	American Legion Memorial Stadium; Charlotte, NC	L 7–13	7,000	
October 19	Sewanee*	Richardson Field; Davidson, NC	W 27–20	6,000	
October 26	at Furman	Sirrine Stadium; Greenville, SC	L 7–40	6,000	
November 2	Centre*^{†}	Richardson Field; Davidson, NC	W 27–12	5,000	
November 9	at No. 12 Duke	Duke Stadium; Durham, NC	L 13–46	5,000	
November 16	Hampden–Sydney*	Richardson Field; Davidson, NC	W 26–0	1,500	
November 30	vs. The Citadel	Legion Stadium; Wilmington, NC	W 20–6	5,000	
*Non-conference game; ^{†}Homecoming; Rankings from AP Poll released prior to the game
