= 1940 Furman Purple Hurricane football team =

American college football season

1940 Furman Purple Hurricane football
- Conference: Southern Conference
- Record: 5–4 (4–3 SoCon)
- Head coach: Dizzy McLeod (9th season)
- Captain: Pepper Martin
- Home stadium: Sirrine Stadium

1940 Southern Conference football standings
	Conf.					Overall
Team	W		L		T	W		L		T
Clemson $	4	–	0	–	0	6	–	2	–	1
No. 18 Duke	4	–	1	–	0	7	–	2	–	0
Wake Forest	4	–	2	–	0	7	–	3	–	0
William & Mary	2	–	1	–	1	6	–	2	–	1
North Carolina	3	–	2	–	0	6	–	4	–	0
Richmond	3	–	2	–	0	7	–	3	–	0
VMI	3	–	2	–	1	7	–	2	–	1
Furman	4	–	3	–	0	5	–	4	–	0
Washington and Lee	1	–	1	–	1	2	–	7	–	1
VPI	2	–	3	–	0	5	–	5	–	0
NC State	3	–	5	–	0	3	–	6	–	0
Maryland	0	–	1	–	1	2	–	6	–	1
South Carolina	1	–	3	–	0	3	–	6	–	0
Davidson	1	–	5	–	0	5	–	5	–	0
The Citadel	0	–	4	–	0	4	–	5	–	0
$ – Conference champion; Rankings from AP Poll

The 1940 Furman Purple Hurricane football team was an American football team that represented Furman University as a member of the Southern Conference (SoCon) during the 1940 college football season. In their ninth year under head coach Dizzy McLeod, the Purple Hurricane compiled an overall record of 5–4 with a conference mark of 4–3, and finished eighth in the SoCon.

Furman was ranked at No. 81 (out of 697 college football teams) in the final rankings under the Litkenhous Difference by Score system for 1940.

== Schedule ==
Date	Time	Opponent	Site	Result	Attendance	Source
September 27		Erskine*	Sirrine Stadium; Greenville, SC	W 40–0		
October 5		at Wake Forest	Groves Stadium; Wake Forest, NC	L 0–19	4,000	
October 11		The Citadel	Sirrine Stadium; Greenville, SC (rivalry)	W 36–7	3,500	
October 19		at Ohio*	Ohio Stadium; Athens, OH	L 6–15	9,000	
October 26		Davidson	Sirrine Stadium; Greenville, SC	W 40–7	6,000	
November 2		at NC State	Riddick Stadium; Raleigh, NC	W 20–6	12,000	
November 9	2:30 p.m.	at VPI	Miles Stadium; Blacksburg, VA	L 21–38	4,000	
November 16		South Carolina	Sirrine Stadium; Greenville, SC	W 25–7	8,500	
November 23		Clemson	Sirrine Stadium; Greenville, SC	L 7–13	19,000	
*Non-conference game
