= 1940 Southwest Texas State Bobcats football team =

American college football season

1940 Southwest Texas State Bobcats football
- Conference: Lone Star Conference
- Record: 3–5–1 (0–4 LSC)
- Head coach: Joe Bailey Cheaney (6th season)
- Home stadium: Evans Field

1940 Lone Star Conference football standings
| | Conf. | | | | | Overall |
| Team | W | | L | | T | W | | L | | T |
|---|---|---|---|---|---|---|---|---|---|---|
| North Texas State $ | 4 | – | 0 | – | 0 | 6 | – | 3 | – | 0 |
| Sam Houston State | 3 | – | 1 | – | 0 | 8 | – | 2 | – | 0 |
| East Texas State | 2 | – | 2 | – | 0 | 4 | – | 4 | – | 0 |
| Stephen F. Austin | 1 | – | 3 | – | 0 | 4 | – | 5 | – | 0 |
| Southwest Texas State | 0 | – | 4 | – | 0 | 3 | – | 5 | – | 1 |
$ – Conference champion

The 1940 Southwest Texas State Bobcats football team was an American football team that represented Southwest Texas State Teachers College (now known as Texas State University) during the 1940 college football season as a member of the Lone Star Conference (LSC). In their sixth year under head coach Joe Bailey Cheaney, the team compiled an overall record of 3–5–1 with a mark of 0–4 in conference play.

Southwest Texas was ranked at No. 187 (out of 697 college football teams) in the final rankings under the Litkenhous Difference by Score system for 1940.

== Schedule ==
| Date | Opponent | Site | Result | Source |
|---|---|---|---|---|
| September 20 | Howard Payne* | Evans Field; San Marcos, TX | W 7–6 | |
| September 28 | Schreiner* | Evans Field; San Marcos, TX | T 0–0 | |
| October 5 | Randolph Field* | Evans Field; San Marcos, TX | W 55–6 | |
| October 11 | Southwestern (TX)* | Evans Field; San Marcos, TX | W 6–0 | |
| October 19 | at Texas A&I* | Kingsville, TX | L 13–19 | |
| October 26 | at Stephen F. Austin | Birdwell Field; Nacogdoches, TX | L 0–33 | |
| November 1 | at North Texas State | Eagle Field; Denton, TX | L 0–22 | |
| November 8 | East Texas State | Evans Field; San Marcos, TX | L 0–13 | |
| November 16 | Sam Houston State | Evans Field; San Marcos, TX (rivalry) | L 12–19 | |
*Non-conference game
