= 1940 Richmond Spiders football team =

American college football season

1940 Richmond Spiders football
- Conference: Southern Conference
- Record: 6–3 (3–2 SoCon)
- Head coach: Glenn Thistlethwaite (7th season)
- Captain: Harold McVay
- Home stadium: City Stadium

1940 Southern Conference football standings
	Conf.					Overall
Team	W		L		T	W		L		T
Clemson $	4	–	0	–	0	6	–	2	–	1
No. 18 Duke	4	–	1	–	0	7	–	2	–	0
Wake Forest	4	–	2	–	0	7	–	3	–	0
William & Mary	2	–	1	–	1	6	–	2	–	1
North Carolina	3	–	2	–	0	6	–	4	–	0
Richmond	3	–	2	–	0	7	–	3	–	0
VMI	3	–	2	–	1	7	–	2	–	1
Furman	4	–	3	–	0	5	–	4	–	0
Washington and Lee	1	–	1	–	1	2	–	7	–	1
VPI	2	–	3	–	0	5	–	5	–	0
NC State	3	–	5	–	0	3	–	6	–	0
Maryland	0	–	1	–	1	2	–	6	–	1
South Carolina	1	–	3	–	0	3	–	6	–	0
Davidson	1	–	5	–	0	5	–	5	–	0
The Citadel	0	–	4	–	0	4	–	5	–	0
$ – Conference champion; Rankings from AP Poll

The 1940 Richmond Spiders football team was an American football team that represented the University of Richmond as a member of the Southern Conference (SoCon) during the 1940 college football season. In their seventh season under head coach Glenn Thistlethwaite, Richmond compiled a 6–3 record, with a mark of 3–2 in conference play, finishing tied for fifth place in the SoCon.

Richmond was ranked at No. 128 (out of 697 college football teams) in the final rankings under the Litkenhous Difference by Score system for 1940.

== Schedule ==
Date	Time	Opponent	Site	Result	Attendance	Source
September 20		at Apprentice*	Saunders Stadium; Newport News, VA	W 38–0	3,000	
September 28		Randolph–Macon*	City Stadium; Richmond, VA	W 28–0	2,500	
October 5	3:00 p.m.	at VPI	Miles Stadium; Blacksburg, VA	W 13–7	6,000	
October 12		at Franklin & Marshall*	Williamson Field; Lancaster, PA	L 0–21	15,000	
October 19		Washington and Lee	City Stadium; Richmond, VA	L 0–3	5,000	
October 26		VMI	City Stadium; Richmond, VA (rivalry)	W 9–7	10,000	
November 2		Hampden–Sydney*	City Stadium; Richmond, VA	W 39–13	4,000	
November 9		North Carolina	City Stadium; Richmond, VA	W 14–13	8,500	
November 21		William & Mary	City Stadium; Richmond, VA (rivalry)	L 0–16	18,000	
*Non-conference game
