= 1940 NC State Wolfpack football team =

American college football season

1940 NC State Wolfpack football
- Conference: Southern Conference
- Record: 3–6 (3–5 SoCon)
- Head coach: Williams Newton (4th season)
- Home stadium: Riddick Stadium

1940 Southern Conference football standings
	Conf.					Overall
Team	W		L		T	W		L		T
Clemson $	4	–	0	–	0	6	–	2	–	1
No. 18 Duke	4	–	1	–	0	7	–	2	–	0
Wake Forest	4	–	2	–	0	7	–	3	–	0
William & Mary	2	–	1	–	1	6	–	2	–	1
North Carolina	3	–	2	–	0	6	–	4	–	0
Richmond	3	–	2	–	0	7	–	3	–	0
VMI	3	–	2	–	1	7	–	2	–	1
Furman	4	–	3	–	0	5	–	4	–	0
Washington and Lee	1	–	1	–	1	2	–	7	–	1
VPI	2	–	3	–	0	5	–	5	–	0
NC State	3	–	5	–	0	3	–	6	–	0
Maryland	0	–	1	–	1	2	–	6	–	1
South Carolina	1	–	3	–	0	3	–	6	–	0
Davidson	1	–	5	–	0	5	–	5	–	0
The Citadel	0	–	4	–	0	4	–	5	–	0
$ – Conference champion; Rankings from AP Poll

The 1940 NC State Wolfpack football team was an American football team that represented North Carolina State University as a member of the Southern Conference (SoCon) during the 1940 college football season. In its fourth season under head coach Williams Newton, the team compiled a 3–6 record (3–5 against SoCon opponents) and was outscored by a total of 161 to 120.

NC State was ranked at No. 83 (out of 697 college football teams) in the final rankings under the Litkenhous Difference by Score system for 1940.

== Schedule ==
Date	Opponent	Site	Result	Attendance	Source
September 20	vs. William & Mary	Foreman Field; Norfolk, VA	W 16–0	17,000	
September 28	Davidson	Riddick Stadium; Raleigh, NC	W 34–0		
October 5	vs. Clemson	American Legion Memorial Stadium; Charlotte, NC (rivalry)	L 7–26	14,500	
October 19	North Carolina	Riddick Stadium; Raleigh, NC (rivalry)	L 7–13	15,000	
October 26	Mississippi State*	Riddick Stadium; Raleigh, NC	L 10–26	10,000	
November 2	Furman	Riddick Stadium; Raleigh, NC	L 6–20	12,000	
November 9	Wake Forest	Riddick Stadium; Raleigh, NC (rivalry)	L 14–20	10,000	
November 16	at The Citadel	Johnson Hagood Stadium; Charleston, SC	W 20–14	3,500	
November 23	at Duke	Duke Stadium; Durham, NC (rivalry)	L 6–42	10,000	
*Non-conference game
