= 1940 South Carolina Gamecocks football team =

American college football season

1940 South Carolina Gamecocks football
- Conference: Southern Conference
- Record: 3–6 (1–3 SoCon)
- Head coach: Rex Enright (3rd season)
- Captain: Kirt Norton
- Home stadium: Carolina Municipal Stadium

1940 Southern Conference football standings
| | Conf. | | | | | Overall |
| Team | W | | L | | T | W | | L | | T |
|---|---|---|---|---|---|---|---|---|---|---|
| Clemson $ | 4 | – | 0 | – | 0 | 6 | – | 2 | – | 1 |
| No. 18 Duke | 4 | – | 1 | – | 0 | 7 | – | 2 | – | 0 |
| Wake Forest | 4 | – | 2 | – | 0 | 7 | – | 3 | – | 0 |
| William & Mary | 2 | – | 1 | – | 1 | 6 | – | 2 | – | 1 |
| North Carolina | 3 | – | 2 | – | 0 | 6 | – | 4 | – | 0 |
| Richmond | 3 | – | 2 | – | 0 | 7 | – | 3 | – | 0 |
| VMI | 3 | – | 2 | – | 1 | 7 | – | 2 | – | 1 |
| Furman | 4 | – | 3 | – | 0 | 5 | – | 4 | – | 0 |
| Washington and Lee | 1 | – | 1 | – | 1 | 2 | – | 7 | – | 1 |
| VPI | 2 | – | 3 | – | 0 | 5 | – | 5 | – | 0 |
| NC State | 3 | – | 5 | – | 0 | 3 | – | 6 | – | 0 |
| Maryland | 0 | – | 1 | – | 1 | 2 | – | 6 | – | 1 |
| South Carolina | 1 | – | 3 | – | 0 | 3 | – | 6 | – | 0 |
| Davidson | 1 | – | 5 | – | 0 | 5 | – | 5 | – | 0 |
| The Citadel | 0 | – | 4 | – | 0 | 4 | – | 5 | – | 0 |
$ – Conference champion; Rankings from AP Poll

The 1940 South Carolina Gamecocks football team was an American football team that represented the University of South Carolina as a member of the Southern Conference (SoCon) during the 1940 college football season. In their third season under head coach Rex Enright, the Gamecocks compiled an overall record of 3–6 with a mark of 1–3 in conference play, tying for 12th place in the SoCon.

South Carolina was ranked at No. 118 (out of 697 college football teams) in the final rankings under the Litkenhous Difference by Score system for 1940.

== Schedule ==
| Date | Opponent | Site | Result | Attendance | Source |
|---|---|---|---|---|---|
| October 5 | Georgia* | Carolina Municipal Stadium; Columbia, SC (rivalry) | L 2–33 | 15,000 | |
| October 11 | at Duquesne* | Forbes Field; Pittsburgh, PA | L 21–27 | 8,700 | |
| October 24 | No. 13 Clemson | Carolina Municipal Stadium; Columbia, SC (rivalry) | L 13–21 | 22,000 | |
| November 2 | at No. 18 Penn State* | New Beaver Field; State College, PA | L 0–12 | 9,346 | |
| November 9 | Kansas State* | Carolina Municipal Stadium; Columbia, SC | W 20–13 | 11,000 | |
| November 16 | at Furman | Sirrine Stadium; Greenville, SC | L 7–25 | 8,500 | |
| November 22 | at Miami (FL)* | Burdine Stadium; Miami, FL | W 7–2 | 11,000 | |
| November 28 | vs. Wake Forest | American Legion Memorial Stadium; Charlotte, NC | L 6–7 | 9,000 | |
| December 7 | The Citadel | Johnson Hagood Stadium; Charleston, SC | W 31–6 | 6,000 | |
*Non-conference game; Rankings from AP Poll released prior to the game
