= 1940 North Texas State Teachers Eagles football team =

American college football season

1940 North Texas State Teachers Eagles football

LSC champion
- Conference: Lone Star Conference
- Record: 6–3 (4–0 LSC)
- Head coach: Jack Sisco (12th season)
- Home stadium: Eagle Field

1940 Lone Star Conference football standings
	Conf.					Overall
Team	W		L		T	W		L		T
North Texas State $	4	–	0	–	0	6	–	3	–	0
Sam Houston State	3	–	1	–	0	8	–	2	–	0
East Texas State	2	–	2	–	0	4	–	4	–	0
Stephen F. Austin	1	–	3	–	0	4	–	5	–	0
Southwest Texas State	0	–	4	–	0	3	–	5	–	1
$ – Conference champion

The 1940 North Texas State Teachers Eagles football team was an American football team that represented the North Texas State Teachers College (now known as the University of North Texas) during the 1940 college football season as a member of the Lone Star Conference. In their 12th year under head coach Jack Sisco, the Eagles compiled a 6–3 record.

North Texas was ranked at No. 86 (out of 697 college football teams) in the final rankings under the Litkenhous Difference by Score system for 1940.

== Schedule ==
Date	Opponent	Site	Result	Source
September 21	vs. Abilene Christian*	Lackey Field; Midland, TX	L 13–19	
September 28	at Baylor*	Waco Stadium; Waco, TX	L 20–27	
October 5	at SMU*	Ownby Stadium; University Park, TX (rivalry)	L 7–20	
October 11	Arkansas A&M*	Eagle Field; Denton, TX	W 79–0	
October 18	Stephen F. Austin	Eagle Field; Denton, TX	W 27–0	
October 25	at Sam Houston State	Pritchett Field; Huntsville, TX	W 7–6	
November 1	Southwest Texas State	Eagle Field; Denton, TX	W 22–0	
November 8	Austin*	Eagle Field; Denton, TX	W 14–0	
November 16	at East Texas State	Lion Stadium; Commerce, TX	W 10–7	
*Non-conference game
