= 1940 Millersville Marauders football team =

American college football season

1940 Millersville Marauders football

PSTCC co-champion
- Conference: Pennsylvania State Teachers College Conference
- Record: 7–0 (4–0 PSTCC)
- Head coach: Ivan Stehman (3rd season)

1940 Pennsylvania State Teachers Conference football standings
	Conf.					Overall
Team	W		L		T	W		L		T
Millersville +	4	–	0	–	0	7	–	0	–	0
Indiana (PA) +	7	–	0	–	1	7	–	0	–	1
West Chester	2	–	0	–	0	5	–	2	–	1
East Stroudsburg	4	–	1	–	0	7	–	1	–	0
Clarion	2	–	1	–	0	4	–	3	–	0
Slippery Rock	1	–	1	–	1	4	–	3	–	1
Kutztown	2	–	2	–	0	3	–	5	–	0
Shippensburg	2	–	3	–	2	3	–	3	–	2
Mansfield	2	–	4	–	0	3	–	4	–	0
California (PA)	1	–	2	–	0	1	–	5	–	0
Lock Haven	2	–	5	–	0	2	–	7	–	0
Bloomsburg	1	–	6	–	0	1	–	6	–	0
Edinboro	0	–	5	–	0	0	–	7	–	0
+ – Conference co-champions

The 1940 Millersville Marauders football team was an American football team that represented Millersville State Teachers College (now known as Millersville University of Pennsylvania) as a member of the Pennsylvania State Teachers College Conference (PSTCC) during the 1940 college football season. In their third year under head coach Ivan Stehman, the Marauders compiled a 7–0 record (4–0 against PSTCC opponents), won the PSTCC championship, and outscored opponents by a total of 166 to 25.

== Schedule ==
Date	Opponent	Site	Result	Attendance	Source
September 28	at Bloomsburg	Bloomsburg, PA	W 12–0		
October 5	Shepherd*	Millersville, PA	W 34–0		
October 12	Montclair State*	Millersville, PA	W 21–6		
October 19	at Mansfield	Mansfield, PA	W 20–6		
October 26	at Blue Ridge*	Blue Ridge	W 20–6		
November 9	at Shippensburg	Shippensburg, PA	W 27–7	3,000	
November 16	Kutztown^{†}	Millersville, PA	W 32–0		
*Non-conference game; ^{†}Homecoming
