= 1940 Clemson Tigers football team =

American college football season

1940 Clemson Tigers football

SoCon champion
- Conference: Southern Conference
- Record: 6–2–1 (4–0 SoCon)
- Head coach: Frank Howard (1st season)
- Captain: Red Sharpe
- Home stadium: Riggs Field

1940 Southern Conference football standings
	Conf.					Overall
Team	W		L		T	W		L		T
Clemson $	4	–	0	–	0	6	–	2	–	1
No. 18 Duke	4	–	1	–	0	7	–	2	–	0
Wake Forest	4	–	2	–	0	7	–	3	–	0
William & Mary	2	–	1	–	1	6	–	2	–	1
North Carolina	3	–	2	–	0	6	–	4	–	0
Richmond	3	–	2	–	0	7	–	3	–	0
VMI	3	–	2	–	1	7	–	2	–	1
Furman	4	–	3	–	0	5	–	4	–	0
Washington and Lee	1	–	1	–	1	2	–	7	–	1
VPI	2	–	3	–	0	5	–	5	–	0
NC State	3	–	5	–	0	3	–	6	–	0
Maryland	0	–	1	–	1	2	–	6	–	1
South Carolina	1	–	3	–	0	3	–	6	–	0
Davidson	1	–	5	–	0	5	–	5	–	0
The Citadel	0	–	4	–	0	4	–	5	–	0
$ – Conference champion; Rankings from AP Poll

The 1940 Clemson Tigers football team was an American football team that represented Clemson College in the Southern Conference during the 1940 college football season. In their first season under head coach Frank Howard, the Tigers compiled a 6–2–1 record (4–0 against conference opponents), won the Southern Conference championship, and outscored opponents by a total of 182 to 73.

Red Sharpe was the team captain. The team's statistical leaders included tailback Chippy Maness with 388 passing yards and 472 rushing yards and wingback Aubrey Rion with 28 points scored (4 touchdowns, 4 extra points).

Three Clemson players were selected as first-team players on the 1940 All-Southern Conference football team: end Joe Blalock; tackle George Fritts; and back Charlie Timmons.

Clemson was ranked at No. 54 (out of 697 college football teams) in the final rankings under the Litkenhous Difference by Score system for 1940.

== Schedule ==
Date	Time	Opponent	Rank	Site	Result	Attendance	Source
September 21	3:00 p.m.	at Presbyterian*		Bailey Stadium; Clinton, SC	W 38–0	8,000	
September 28		Wofford*		Riggs Field; Clemson, SC	W 26–0	4,000	
October 5		vs. NC State		American Legion Memorial Stadium; Charlotte, NC (rivalry)	W 26–7	14,500	
October 12		Wake Forest		Riggs Field; Clemson, SC	W 39–0	18,000	
October 24		at South Carolina	No. 13	Municipal Stadium; Columbia, SC (rivalry)	W 21–13	22,000	
November 2		at Tulane*	No. 10	Tulane Stadium; New Orleans, LA	L 0–13	31,000	
November 9		at Auburn*		Auburn Stadium; Auburn, AL (rivalry)	L 7–21	12,000	
November 16		at Southwestern (TN)*		Crump Stadium; Memphis, TN	T 12–12	6,000	
November 23		at Furman		Sirrine Stadium; Greenville, SC	W 13–7	19,000	
*Non-conference game; Rankings from AP Poll released prior to the game; All times are in Eastern time

== Rankings ==
Ranking movements Legend: ██ Increase in ranking ██ Decrease in ranking — = Not ranked т = Tied with team above or below ( ) = First-place votes
	Week							
Poll	1	2	3	4	5	6	7	Final
AP	12	13 (1)	10т (2)	—	—	—	—	—
