= 1940 Duke Blue Devils football team =

American college football season

1940 Duke Blue Devils football
- Conference: Southern Conference

Ranking
- AP: No. 18
- Record: 7–2 (4–1 SoCon)
- Head coach: Wallace Wade (10th season)
- Offensive scheme: Single-wing
- MVP: Jasper Davis
- Captain: Alex Winterson
- Home stadium: Duke Stadium

1940 Southern Conference football standings
	Conf.					Overall
Team	W		L		T	W		L		T
Clemson $	4	–	0	–	0	6	–	2	–	1
No. 18 Duke	4	–	1	–	0	7	–	2	–	0
Wake Forest	4	–	2	–	0	7	–	3	–	0
William & Mary	2	–	1	–	1	6	–	2	–	1
North Carolina	3	–	2	–	0	6	–	4	–	0
Richmond	3	–	2	–	0	7	–	3	–	0
VMI	3	–	2	–	1	7	–	2	–	1
Furman	4	–	3	–	0	5	–	4	–	0
Washington and Lee	1	–	1	–	1	2	–	7	–	1
VPI	2	–	3	–	0	5	–	5	–	0
NC State	3	–	5	–	0	3	–	6	–	0
Maryland	0	–	1	–	1	2	–	6	–	1
South Carolina	1	–	3	–	0	3	–	6	–	0
Davidson	1	–	5	–	0	5	–	5	–	0
The Citadel	0	–	4	–	0	4	–	5	–	0
$ – Conference champion; Rankings from AP Poll

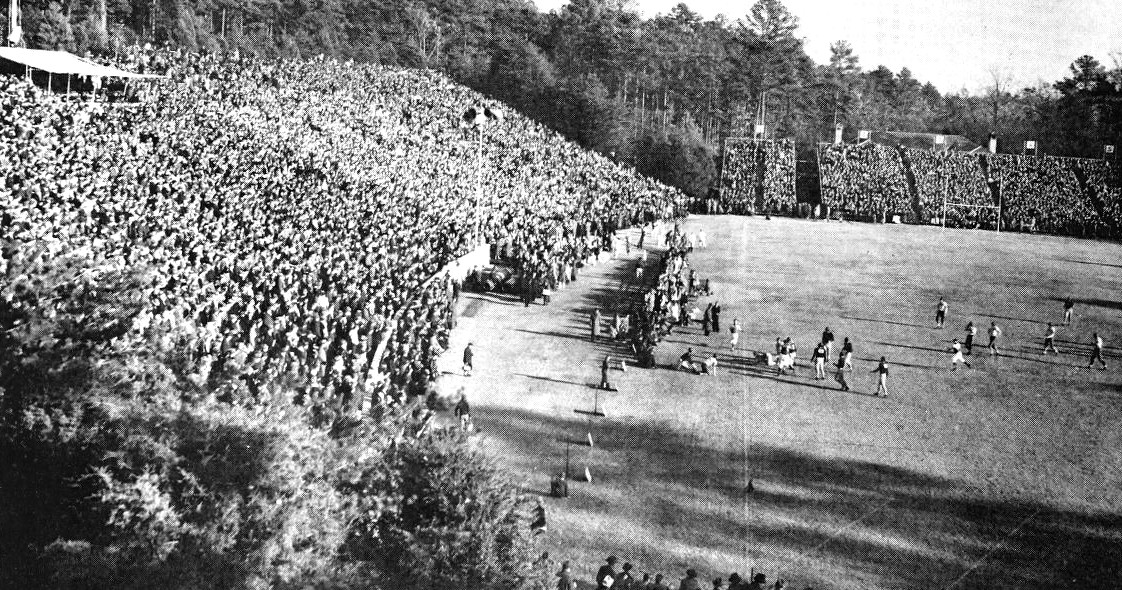
Duke Blue Devils vs. North Carolina Tar Heels, Kenan Memorial Stadium

The 1940 Duke Blue Devils football team was an American football team that represented Duke University as a member of the Southern Conference during the 1940 college football season. In its tenth season under head coach Wallace Wade, the team compiled a 7–2 record (4–1 against conference opponents), finished second in the conference, was ranked No. 18 in the final AP Poll, and outscored opponents by a total of 203 to 52. Alex Winterson was the team captain. The team played its home games at Duke Stadium in Durham, North Carolina.

== Schedule ==
Date	Opponent	Rank	Site	Result	Attendance	Source
September 28	VMI		Duke Stadium; Durham, NC	W 23–0	7,000	
October 5	at Tennessee		Shields–Watkins Field; Knoxville, TN	L 0–13	25,000	
October 19	at Colgate		Colgate Athletic Field; Hamilton, NY	W 13–0	14,000	
October 26	at Wake Forest		Groves Stadium; Wake Forest, NC (rivalry)	W 23–0	21,000	
November 2	Georgia Tech^{†}	No. 18	Duke Stadium; Durham, NC	W 41–7	34,000	
November 9	Davidson	No. 12	Duke Stadium; Durham, NC	W 46–13	5,000	
November 16	at North Carolina	No. 12	Kenan Memorial Stadium; Chapel Hill, NC (rivalry)	L 3–6	41,000	
November 23	NC State		Duke Stadium; Durham, NC (rivalry)	W 42–6	10,000	
November 30	Pittsburgh	No. 20	Duke Stadium; Durham, NC	W 12–7	21,000	
^{†}Homecoming; Rankings from AP Poll released prior to the game

== Rankings ==
Ranking movements Legend: ██ Increase in ranking ██ Decrease in ranking — = Not ranked т = Tied with team above or below ( ) = First-place votes
	Week							
Poll	1	2	3	4	5	6	7	Final
AP	—	—	18т	12т	12 (2)	—	20т	18
