= 1940 Wake Forest Demon Deacons football team =

American college football season

1940 Wake Forest Demon Deacons football
- Conference: Southern Conference
- Record: 7–3 (4–2 SoCon)
- Head coach: Peahead Walker (4th season)
- Captain: Jimmy Ringgold
- Home stadium: Groves Stadium

1940 Southern Conference football standings
	Conf.					Overall
Team	W		L		T	W		L		T
Clemson $	4	–	0	–	0	6	–	2	–	1
No. 18 Duke	4	–	1	–	0	7	–	2	–	0
Wake Forest	4	–	2	–	0	7	–	3	–	0
William & Mary	2	–	1	–	1	6	–	2	–	1
North Carolina	3	–	2	–	0	6	–	4	–	0
Richmond	3	–	2	–	0	7	–	3	–	0
VMI	3	–	2	–	1	7	–	2	–	1
Furman	4	–	3	–	0	5	–	4	–	0
Washington and Lee	1	–	1	–	1	2	–	7	–	1
VPI	2	–	3	–	0	5	–	5	–	0
NC State	3	–	5	–	0	3	–	6	–	0
Maryland	0	–	1	–	1	2	–	6	–	1
South Carolina	1	–	3	–	0	3	–	6	–	0
Davidson	1	–	5	–	0	5	–	5	–	0
The Citadel	0	–	4	–	0	4	–	5	–	0
$ – Conference champion; Rankings from AP Poll

The 1940 Wake Forest Demon Deacons football team was an American football team that represented Wake Forest University during the 1940 college football season. In its fourth season under head coach Peahead Walker, the team compiled a 7–3 record and finished in third place in the Southern Conference.

Wake Forest back Tony Gallovich was selected by the Associated Press as a first-team player on the 1940 All-Southern Conference football team.

Wake Forest was ranked at No. 57 (out of 697 college football teams) in the final rankings under the Litkenhous Difference by Score system for 1940.

== Schedule ==
Date	Opponent	Site	Result	Attendance	Source
September 21	William Jewell*	Groves Stadium; Wake Forest, NC	W 79–0	1,500	
September 28	at North Carolina	Kenan Memorial Stadium; Chapel Hill, NC (rivalry)	W 12–0	21,000	
October 5	Furman	Groves Stadium; Wake Forest, NC	W 19–0	4,000	
October 12	at Clemson	Riggs Field; Clemson, SC	L 0–39	18,000	
October 19	Marshall*	Groves Stadium; Wake Forest, NC	W 31–19	5,000	
October 26	Duke	Groves Stadium; Wake Forest, NC (rivalry)	L 0–23	21,000	
November 1	at George Washington*	Griffith Stadium; Washington, DC	W 18–0	10,000	
November 9	at NC State	Riddick Stadium; Raleigh, NC (rivalry)	W 20–14	10,000	
November 16	at Texas Tech*	Tech Field; Lubbock, TX	L 7–12	10,000	
November 28	vs. South Carolina	American Legion Memorial Stadium; Charlotte, NC	W 7–6	9,000	
*Non-conference game
