= 1940 college football season =

American college football season

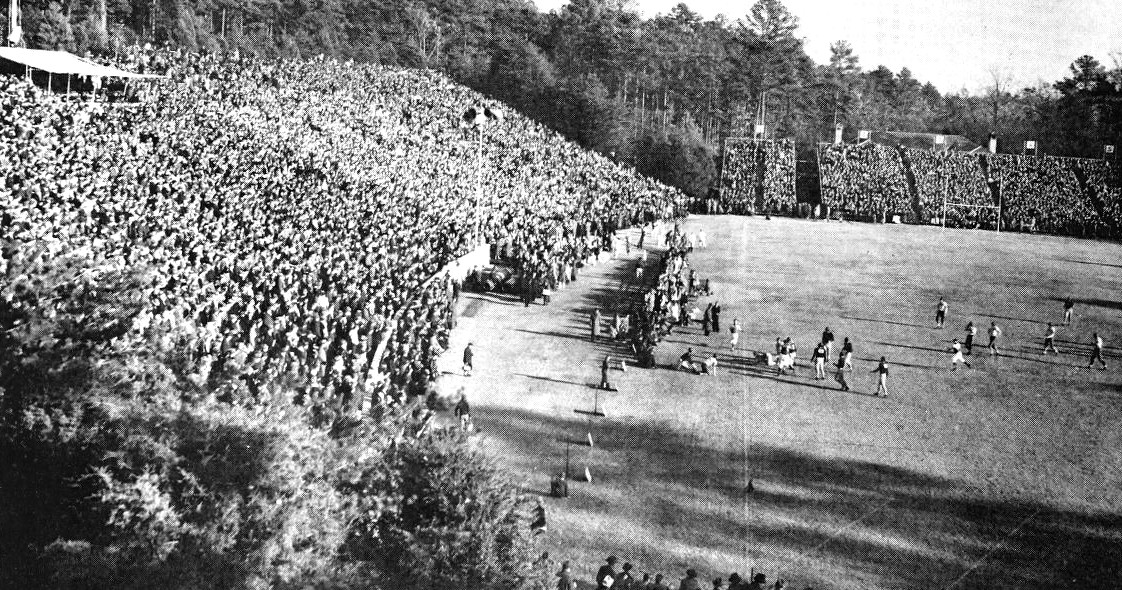
- Duke v North Carolina game at Kenan Memorial Stadium
- First AP No. 1 of season: Cornell
- Number of bowls: 5
- Champion(s): Minnesota (Note: per AP poll, Boand System, Dickinson System, Houlgate System, Litkenhous Ratings, Berryman QPRS, College Football Researchers Association, DeVold System, National Championship Foundation, Sagarin Ratings Elo chess method, Sagarin Ratings Predictor method); Stanford (Note: per Poling System, Billingsley Report, Helms Athletic Foundation); Tennessee (Note: per Dunkel System)
- Heisman: Tom Harmon, (halfback, Michigan)

The 1940 college football season was the 72nd season of intercollegiate football in the United States. Competition included schools from the Big Ten Conference, the Pacific Coast Conference (PCC), the Southeastern Conference (SEC), the Big Six Conference, the Southern Conference, the Southwestern Conference, and numerous smaller conferences and independent programs.

The teams ranked highest in the final Associated Press poll in December 1940 were:

1. Minnesota - Led by head coach Bernie Bierman, the Golden Gophers compiled an 8–0 record, won the Big Ten championship, and outscored opponents by a total of 154 to 71. Halfback George Franck was a consensus All-American and placed third in the Heisman Trophy voting. Minnesota did not play in a bowl game and was selected as national champions by the Associated Press (AP) poll at the end of the regular season.
2. Stanford - Led by head coach Clark Shaughnessy, the Indians compiled a perfect 10–0 record, including a victory over No. 7 Nebraska in the 1941 Rose Bowl. Stanford was selected as national champions by the Poling System and Williamson System and retroactively by the Helms Athletic Foundation and Billingsley Report.
3. Michigan - The Wolverines compiled a 7–1 record with its only loss coming against Minnesota by a 7–6 score. Halfback Tom Harmon won the Heisman Trophy.
4. Tennessee - Led by head coach Robert Neyland, the Volunteers compiled a 10–0 regular season record but lost to Boston College in the Sugar Bowl. Tennessee was selected as national champions by the Dunkel System.
5. Boston College - In their final season under head coach Frank Leahy, the Eagles compiled a perfect 11–0 record, including a victory over Tennessee in the Sugar Bowl, to lay claim to a national championship.

The year's statistical leaders included Al Ghesquiere of Detroit with 958 rushing yards, Johnny Knolla of Creighton with 1,420 yards of total offense, Johnny Supulski of Manhattan with 1,190 passing yards, Hank Stanton of Arizona with 820 receiving yards, and Tom Harmon with 117 points scored.

== Conference and program changes ==
=== Conference changes ===
- One conference began play during 1940:
  - New Mexico Intercollegiate Conference – an NCAA College Division and NAIA conference active through the 1962 season; later known as the Frontier Conference
- One conference played its final season in 1940:
  - Alamo Conference – conference active since the 1936 season

=== Membership changes ===
School	1939 Conference	1940 Conference
Chicago Maroons	Big Ten	Dropped Program
Loyola (LA) Wolf Pack	Dixie	Dropped Program
St. Joseph's (PA) Hawks	Independent	Dropped Program

== September ==
September 28 Defending champion Texas A&M beat Texas A&I (later the university's Kingsville campus), 26–0. Tennessee beat Mercer 49–0. USC and Washington State played to a 14–14 tie. Tulane lost to Boston College 27–7. Michigan won at California 41–0. Minnesota defeated Washington 19–14 in Minneapolis.

== October ==
October 5 In San Antonio, Texas A&M beat Tulsa 41–6. Tennessee beat Duke 13–0. Cornell beat Colgate 34–0. Northwestern won at Syracuse, 40–0. Minnesota beat Nebraska 13–7. Michigan beat Michigan State 21–14.

October 12 Cornell won at Army 45–0. In Los Angeles, Texas A&M beat UCLA 7–0. Tennessee beat Chattanooga 53–0. Northwestern beat Ohio State 6–3. Michigan won at Harvard 26–0. The top five in the year's first AP Poll were No. 1 Cornell, No. 2 Texas A&M, No. 3 Michigan, No. 4 Northwestern, and No. 5 Tennessee.

October 19 No. 1 Cornell beat Syracuse 33–6. No. 2 Texas A&M beat TCU 21–7. No. 3 Michigan beat Illinois 28–0. In Birmingham, No. 5 Tennessee beat Alabama, 27–12. No. 6 Notre Dame beat Carnegie Tech 61–0. The resulting AP Poll was No. 1 Cornell, No. 2 Notre Dame, No. 3 Michigan, No. 4 Texas A&M, and No. 5 Tennessee. Despite a 27–7 win at Wisconsin, Northwestern fell from 4th to 7th; previous No. 7 Minnesota moved up one spot with a 13-7 win over No. 15 Ohio State in Columbus.

October 26 No. 1 Cornell beat Ohio State 21–7. No. 2 Notre Dame won at Illinois 26–0. No. 3 Michigan beat Pennsylvania 14–0. No. 4 Texas A&M won at Baylor 14–7. No. 5 Tennessee beat Florida 14–0. No. 6 Minnesota beat Iowa 34–6. Cornell, Notre Dame, and Michigan remained as the top three, followed by Minnesota and Texas A&M.

== November ==
November 2 No. 1 Cornell beat Columbia 27–0. No. 2 Notre Dame beat Army 7–0 at Yankee Stadium. No. 3 Michigan was idle. No. 4 Minnesota narrowly won at No. 8 Northwestern, 13–12. No. 5 Texas A&M beat Arkansas 17–0. No. 7 Tennessee beat LSU 28–0. The next AP Poll ranked Cornell, Minnesota, Michigan, Texas A&M, and Tennessee as the top five. Notre Dame fell from No. 2 to No. 7 after their close win over a weak Army team (the Cadets would finish 1-7-1).

November 9 No. 1 Cornell beat Yale 21–0, but dropped to second in the next poll. No. 2 Minnesota and No. 3 Michigan, both unbeaten (5–0–0), met in Minneapolis, with the Gophers winning by one point, 7–6. No. 4 Texas A&M won at No. 14 SMU 19–7. No. 5 Tennessee won at Rhodes College 41–0. No. 6 Stanford beat No. 11 Washington 20–10 to advance its record to 7–0–0. The resulting AP Poll was No. 1 Minnesota, No. 2 Cornell, No. 3 Texas A&M, No. 4 Stanford, and No. 5 Tennessee.

November 16 No. 1 Minnesota beat Purdue 33–6. No. 2 Cornell lost at Dartmouth 3–0 in the famous "Fifth Down" game. No. 3 Texas A&M beat Rice 25–0. No. 4 Stanford beat No. 19 Oregon State 28–14. No. 8 Boston College beat No. 9 Georgetown 19–18 to extend its record to 8–0–0. The next AP Poll featured No. 1 Minnesota, No. 2 Texas A&M, No. 3 Stanford, No. 4 Boston College, and No. 5 Cornell. Previous No. 5 Tennessee fell to No. 6 despite an 8-0-0 record and a 41–14 win over Virginia.

November 23 No. 1 Minnesota closed its season with a 22–13 win at Wisconsin. No. 2 Texas A&M and No. 3 Stanford were idle. No. 4 Boston College beat Auburn 33–7. No. 5 Cornell lost 22-20 to Pennsylvania. No. 7 Michigan won at Ohio State to close its season at 7–1–0 and moved into fifth place behind Minnesota, Texas A&M, Stanford, and Boston College.

On Thanksgiving Day No. 2 Texas A&M lost at Texas 7–0. On November 30 No. 3 Stanford closed its season with a 13–7 win at California, No. 4 Boston College defeated Holy Cross 7–0, and No. 6 Tennessee beat Vanderbilt 20–0. The top five of the final AP Poll were No. 1 Minnesota, No. 2 Stanford, No. 3 Michigan, No. 4 Tennessee, and No. 5 Boston College.

== Conference standings ==
=== Major conference standings ===
1940 Big Six Conference football standings
	Conf.					Overall
Team	W		L		T	W		L		T
No. 7 Nebraska $	5	–	0	–	0	8	–	2	–	0
Oklahoma	4	–	1	–	0	6	–	3	–	0
Missouri	3	–	2	–	0	6	–	3	–	0
Iowa State	2	–	3	–	0	4	–	5	–	0
Kansas State	1	–	4	–	0	2	–	7	–	0
Kansas	0	–	5	–	0	2	–	7	–	0
$ – Conference champion; Rankings from AP Poll

1940 Big Ten Conference football standings
	Conf.					Overall
Team	W		L		T	W		L		T
No. 1 Minnesota $	6	–	0	–	0	8	–	0	–	0
No. 3 Michigan	3	–	1	–	0	7	–	1	–	0
No. 8 Northwestern	4	–	2	–	0	6	–	2	–	0
Ohio State	3	–	3	–	0	4	–	4	–	0
Wisconsin	3	–	3	–	0	4	–	4	–	0
Iowa	2	–	3	–	0	4	–	4	–	0
Indiana	2	–	3	–	0	3	–	5	–	0
Purdue	1	–	4	–	0	2	–	6	–	0
Illinois	0	–	5	–	0	1	–	7	–	0
$ – Conference champion; Rankings from AP Poll

1940 Border Conference football standings
	Conf.					Overall
Team	W		L		T	W		L		T
Arizona State $	3	–	0	–	1	7	–	2	–	2
Arizona	3	–	1	–	0	7	–	2	–	0
Texas Mines	3	–	1	–	1	4	–	4	–	1
New Mexico	3	–	2	–	0	5	–	4	–	0
New Mexico A&M	1	–	4	–	0	3	–	6	–	0
Texas Tech	0	–	1	–	0	9	–	1	–	1
Arizona State–Flagstaff	0	–	5	–	0	2	–	6	–	0
$ – Conference champion

1940 Middle Three Conference football standings
	Conf.					Overall
Team	W		L		T	W		L		T
No. 19 Lafayette $	2	–	0	–	0	9	–	0	–	0
Rutgers	1	–	1	–	0	5	–	3	–	0
Lehigh	0	–	2	–	0	2	–	7	–	0
$ – Conference champion; Rankings from AP Poll

1940 Mountain States Conference football standings
	Conf.					Overall
Team	W		L		T	W		L		T
Utah $	5	–	1	–	0	7	–	2	–	0
Denver	4	–	1	–	1	6	–	2	–	1
Colorado	4	–	1	–	1	5	–	3	–	1
BYU	2	–	3	–	1	2	–	4	–	2
Colorado A&M	1	–	3	–	2	3	–	4	–	2
Utah State	2	–	4	–	0	2	–	5	–	1
Wyoming	0	–	5	–	1	1	–	7	–	1
$ – Conference champion

1940 Pacific Coast Conference football standings
	Conf.					Overall
Team	W		L		T	W		L		T
No. 2 Stanford $	7	–	0	–	0	10	–	0	–	0
No. 10 Washington	7	–	1	–	0	7	–	2	–	0
Oregon State	4	–	3	–	1	5	–	3	–	1
Washington State	3	–	4	–	2	4	–	4	–	2
Oregon	3	–	4	–	1	4	–	4	–	1
California	3	–	4	–	0	4	–	6	–	0
USC	2	–	3	–	2	3	–	4	–	2
Montana	1	–	2	–	0	4	–	4	–	1
UCLA	1	–	6	–	0	1	–	9	–	0
Idaho	0	–	4	–	0	1	–	7	–	1
$ – Conference champion; Rankings from AP Poll

1940 Southeastern Conference football standings
	Conf.					Overall
Team		W		L			W		L
No. 4 Tennessee $	5	–	0	–	0	10	–	1	–	0
No. 9 Mississippi State	4	–	0	–	1	10	–	0	–	1
Ole Miss	3	–	1	–	0	9	–	2	–	0
Alabama	4	–	2	–	0	7	–	2	–	0
Auburn	3	–	2	–	1	6	–	4	–	1
LSU	3	–	3	–	0	6	–	4	–	0
Georgia	2	–	3	–	1	5	–	4	–	1
Florida	2	–	3	–	0	5	–	5	–	0
Kentucky	1	–	2	–	2	5	–	3	–	2
Tulane	1	–	3	–	0	5	–	5	–	0
Vanderbilt	1	–	5	–	1	3	–	6	–	1
Georgia Tech	1	–	5	–	0	3	–	7	–	0
Sewanee	0	–	1	–	0	3	–	5	–	0
$ – Conference champion; Rankings from AP Poll

1940 Southern Conference football standings
	Conf.					Overall
Team	W		L		T	W		L		T
Clemson $	4	–	0	–	0	6	–	2	–	1
No. 18 Duke	4	–	1	–	0	7	–	2	–	0
Wake Forest	4	–	2	–	0	7	–	3	–	0
William & Mary	2	–	1	–	1	6	–	2	–	1
North Carolina	3	–	2	–	0	6	–	4	–	0
Richmond	3	–	2	–	0	7	–	3	–	0
VMI	3	–	2	–	1	7	–	2	–	1
Furman	4	–	3	–	0	5	–	4	–	0
Washington and Lee	1	–	1	–	1	2	–	7	–	1
VPI	2	–	3	–	0	5	–	5	–	0
NC State	3	–	5	–	0	3	–	6	–	0
Maryland	0	–	1	–	1	2	–	6	–	1
South Carolina	1	–	3	–	0	3	–	6	–	0
Davidson	1	–	5	–	0	5	–	5	–	0
The Citadel	0	–	4	–	0	4	–	5	–	0
$ – Conference champion; Rankings from AP Poll

1940 Southwest Conference football standings
	Conf.					Overall
Team	W		L		T	W		L		T
No. 6 Texas A&M $	5	–	1	–	0	9	–	1	–	0
No. 16 SMU	5	–	1	–	0	8	–	1	–	1
Texas	4	–	2	–	0	8	–	2	–	0
Rice	4	–	2	–	0	7	–	3	–	0
TCU	2	–	4	–	0	3	–	7	–	0
Arkansas	1	–	5	–	0	4	–	6	–	0
Baylor	0	–	6	–	0	4	–	6	–	0
$ – Conference champion; Rankings from AP Poll

=== Independents ===
1940 Eastern college football independents records
	Conf.			Overall
Team	W	L	T	W		L		T
No. 5 Boston College		–		11	–	0	–	0
Duquesne		–		7	–	1	–	0
No. 14 Penn		–		6	–	1	–	1
Penn State		–		6	–	1	–	1
No. 12 Fordham		–		7	–	2	–	0
No. 15 Cornell		–		6	–	2	–	0
La Salle		–		6	–	2	–	0
Princeton		–		5	–	2	–	1
Columbia		–		5	–	2	–	2
Brown		–		6	–	3	–	1
Bucknell		–		4	–	2	–	2
Boston University		–		5	–	3	–	0
Colgate		–		5	–	3	–	0
Hofstra		–		4	–	3	–	0
Harvard		–		3	–	2	–	3
Dartmouth		–		5	–	4	–	0
Temple		–		4	–	4	–	1
Tufts		–		4	–	4	–	0
Vermont		–		4	–	4	–	0
Villanova		–		4	–	5	–	0
Pittsburgh		–		3	–	4	–	1
Syracuse		–		3	–	4	–	1
Buffalo		–		3	–	5	–	0
Carnegie Tech		–		3	–	5	–	0
Manhattan		–		3	–	6	–	0
Providence		–		3	–	6	–	0
NYU		–		2	–	7	–	0
Yale		–		1	–	7	–	0
Army		–		1	–	7	–	1
CCNY		–		1	–	5	–	1
Massachusetts State		–		1	–	8	–	0
Rankings from AP Poll

1940 Midwestern college football independents records
	Conf.			Overall
Team	W	L	T	W		L		T
Michigan Tech		–		5	–	1	–	0
Detroit		–		7	–	2	–	0
Notre Dame		–		7	–	2	–	0
Xavier		–		7	–	3	–	0
Ohio		–		5	–	2	–	2
Wayne		–		4	–	1	–	3
Dayton		–		6	–	3	–	0
Cincinnati		–		5	–	3	–	1
Wichita		–		6	–	4	–	0
Central Michigan		–		4	–	3	–	1
Marquette		–		4	–	4	–	0
Michigan State		–		3	–	4	–	1
Ohio Wesleyan		–		2	–	4	–	3
Akron		–		2	–	5	–	2
Western State Teachers		–		2	–	5	–	0
Michigan State Normal		–		1	–	5	–	1
Miami (OH)		–		0	–	7	–	1

1940 Southern college football independents records
	Conf.			Overall
Team	W	L	T	W		L		T
No. 17 Hardin–Simmons		–		9	–	0	–	0
No. 13 Georgetown		–		8	–	2	–	0
Navy		–		6	–	2	–	1
Delaware		–		5	–	3	–	0
East Carolina		–		5	–	3	–	0
Western Maryland		–		5	–	3	–	0
George Washington		–		5	–	3	–	1
Catholic University		–		4	–	3	–	1
West Virginia		–		4	–	4	–	1
Virginia		–		4	–	5	–	0
Georgia Teachers		–		3	–	5	–	0
Roanoke		–		2	–	6	–	0
Oklahoma City		–		1	–	7	–	3
William & Mary Norfolk		–		0	–	6	–	0
Rankings from AP Poll

1940 Western college football independents records
	Conf.			Overall
Team	W	L	T	W		L		T
No. 11 Santa Clara		–		6	–	1	–	1
Cal Poly		–		6	–	3	–	0
Saint Mary's		–		5	–	3	–	0
Gonzaga		–		5	–	4	–	1
Nevada		–		4	–	4	–	1
Humboldt State		–		3	–	4	–	0
Idaho Southern Branch		–		3	–	5	–	0
San Francisco State		–		3	–	5	–	0
Loyola (CA)		–		3	–	7	–	0
Portland		–		2	–	3	–	1
Hawaii		–		2	–	5	–	0
San Francisco		–		1	–	6	–	1
La Verne		–		0	–	6	–	0
Rankings from AP Poll

=== Minor conferences ===
Conference	Champion(s)	Record
Alamo Conference	West Texas State Teachers	2–0
California Collegiate Athletic Association	San Jose State	3–0
Central Intercollegiate Athletics Association	Morgan State College	6–0–1
Central Intercollegiate Athletic Conference	St. Benedict's (KS)	4–0
Far Western Conference	Pacific (OR)	2–0
Indiana Intercollegiate Conference	Butler; Manchester College	4–0
Iowa Intercollegiate Athletic Conference	Dubuque	7–0
Kansas Collegiate Athletic Conference	Kansas Wesleyan	5–1
Lone Star Conference	North Texas State Teachers	4–0
Michigan Intercollegiate Athletic Association	Albion	5–0
Michigan-Ontario Collegiate Conference	Assumption (ON); DeSales (OH); Lawrence Tech	3–1; 3–1; 3–1
Midwest Collegiate Athletic Conference	Beloit	5–1–1
Minnesota Intercollegiate Athletic Conference	Gustavus Adolphus	5–0
Missouri Intercollegiate Athletic Association	Southwest Missouri State Teachers	5–0
Nebraska College Athletic Conference	Doane; Hastings	3–1
Nebraska Intercollegiate Athletic Association	Nebraska State Teachers	2–0–1
New Mexico Intercollegiate Conference	Western New Mexico	3–0
North Central Intercollegiate Athletic Conference	Iowa State Teachers	5–0
North Dakota College Athletic Conference	Mayville State	6–0
Northern Teachers Athletic Conference	St. Cloud State Teachers	4–0
Ohio Athletic Conference	Wittenberg	6–0
Oklahoma Collegiate Athletic Conference	Oklahoma Baptist	5–0–1
Pacific Northwest Conference	Willamette	4–0
Pennsylvania State Athletic Conference	Indiana State Teachers; Millersville State Teachers	7–1; 4–0
Rocky Mountain Athletic Conference	Colorado College	2–0–1
South Dakota Intercollegiate Conference	Northern State Teachers	3–0
Southern California Intercollegiate Athletic Conference	Redlands	3–0–1
Southern Intercollegiate Athletic Conference	Morris Brown	6–1
Southwestern Athletic Conference	Langston; Southern	5–1
Texas Collegiate Athletic Conference	Abilene Christian; Howard Payne; Texas Western	5–1
Washington Intercollegiate Conference	Pacific Lutheran	4–0–1
Wisconsin State Teachers College Conference	North: La Crosse Teachers; South: Whitewater State Teachers	4–0; 4–0

=== Minor conference standings ===
1940 Alamo Conference football standings
	Conf.					Overall
Team	W		L		T	W		L		T
West Texas State $	2	–	0	–	0	7	–	3	–	0
Texas A&I	1	–	1	–	0	6	–	3	–	0
St. Mary's (TX)	0	–	2	–	0	4	–	6	–	1
$ – Conference champion

1940 Bi-State Conference football standings
	Conf.					Overall
Team	W		L		T	W		L		T
Tillotson $	3	–	0	–	0	7	–	1	–	0
Jarvis Christian	3	–	1	–	0	3	–	4	–	0
Louisiana Normal (Grambling)	1	–	2	–	0	2	–	4	–	2
Samuel Huston	0	–	1	–	0	?	–	?	–	?
Paul Quinn	0	–	3	–	0	?	–	?	–	?
$ – Conference champion

1940 Big Four Conference (Ohio) football standings
	Conf.					Overall
Team	W		L		T	W		L		T
Western Reserve $	3	–	0	–	0	8	–	1	–	0
Case	2	–	1	–	0	6	–	2	–	0
Baldwin–Wallace	1	–	2	–	0	4	–	4	–	0
John Carroll	0	–	3	–	0	2	–	6	–	0
$ – Conference champion

1940 California Collegiate Athletic Association football standings
	Conf.					Overall
Team	W		L		T	W		L		T
San Jose State $	3	–	0	–	0	11	–	1	–	0
Fresno State	1	–	1	–	1	9	–	2	–	1
San Diego State	1	–	1	–	1	5	–	3	–	1
Santa Barbara State	0	–	3	–	0	5	–	5	–	0
$ – Conference champion

1940 Central Intercollegiate Conference football standings
	Conf.					Overall
Team	W		L		T	W		L		T
St. Benedict's $	4	–	0	–	0	6	–	4	–	0
Emporia State	3	–	1	–	0	6	–	2	–	0
Fort Hays State	1	–	3	–	0	3	–	3	–	3
Southwestern (KS)	1	–	3	–	0	3	–	5	–	1
Pittsburg State	1	–	3	–	0	3	–	7	–	0
$ – Conference champion

1940 Colored Intercollegiate Athletic Association football standings
	Conf.					Overall
Team	W		L		T	W		L		T
Morgan State $	6	–	0	–	1	7	–	0	–	1
Lincoln (PA)	4	–	1	–	0	7	–	1	–	0
Johnson C. Smith	5	–	1	–	0	8	–	1	–	0
Virginia Union	4	–	2	–	2	5	–	2	–	2
North Carolina A&T	3	–	3	–	1	4	–	4	–	1
North Carolina College	4	–	2	–	0	5	–	2	–	1
Bluefield State	2	–	4	–	1	2	–	6	–	1
Virginia State	2	–	3	–	2	3	–	3	–	2
Shaw	2	–	4	–	2	2	–	4	–	2
Hampton	3	–	4	–	1	3	–	4	–	1
Saint Paul (VA)	2	–	6	–	0	2	–	6	–	0
Howard	1	–	7	–	0	2	–	7	–	0
St. Augustine's	0	–	3	–	0	2	–	3	–	1
$ – Conference champion; Conference standings were based on the Dickinson System.

1940 Dixie Conference football standings
	Conf.					Overall
Team	W		L		T	W		L		T
Chattanooga +	3	–	0	–	1	7	–	1	–	1
Mississippi College +	3	–	0	–	1	5	–	1	–	1
Howard (AL)	4	–	1	–	0	4	–	5	–	0
Spring Hill	1	–	3	–	0	3	–	5	–	0
Southwestern (TN)	0	–	1	–	0	3	–	5	–	1
Millsaps	0	–	3	–	0	4	–	4	–	1
Mercer	0	–	3	–	0	1	–	7	–	0
+ – Conference co-champions

1940 Eastern Pennsylvania Collegiate Conference football standings
	Conf.					Overall
Team	W		L		T	W		L		T
Franklin & Marshall $	3	–	0	–	0	7	–	2	–	0
Muhlenberg	2	–	1	–	0	4	–	6	–	0
Gettysburg	2	–	2	–	0	4	–	4	–	0
Drexel	1	–	1	–	0	2	–	6	–	0
Ursinus	0	–	4	–	0	1	–	6	–	1
$ – Conference champion

1940 Far Western Conference football standings
	Conf.					Overall
Team	W		L		T	W		L		T
Pacific (CA) $	2	–	0	–	0	4	–	5	–	0
Cal Aggies	2	–	1	–	0	4	–	4	–	1
Chico State	1	–	2	–	0	3	–	3	–	1
Humboldt State	0	–	2	–	0	3	–	4	–	0
$ – Conference champion

1940 Illinois College Conference football standings
	Conf.					Overall
Team	W		L		T	W		L		T
Lake Forest +	3	–	0	–	0	6	–	0	–	1
Illinois Wesleyan +	3	–	0	–	0	7	–	1	–	0
Augustana (IL)	2	–	1	–	1	4	–	2	–	2
Millikin	4	–	2	–	0	5	–	3	–	0
Knox (IL)	1	–	1	–	0	4	–	3	–	1
Monmouth (IL)	0	–	1	–	1	0	–	7	–	2
North Central (IL)	1	–	3	–	0	4	–	3	–	0
Wheaton (IL)	0	–	1	–	0	1	–	6	–	1
Bradley	0	–	2	–	0	4	–	4	–	0
Illinois College	0	–	3	–	0	4	–	4	–	0
+ – Conference co-champions

1940 Illinois Intercollegiate Athletic Conference football standings
	Conf.					Overall
Team	W		L		T	W		L		T
Illinois State Normal $	4	–	0	–	0	5	–	3	–	1
Carthage	2	–	0	–	0	5	–	2	–	1
Eastern Illinois	4	–	1	–	0	6	–	1	–	1
Northern Illinois State	2	–	2	–	0	6	–	3	–	0
Elmhurst	1	–	2	–	0	2	–	5	–	1
Western Illinois	0	–	3	–	1	1	–	6	–	1
Southern Illinois	0	–	3	–	1	2	–	5	–	1
Eureka	0	–	2	–	0	2	–	5	–	1

1940 Indiana Intercollegiate Conference football standings
	Conf.					Overall
Team	W		L		T	W		L		T
Manchester +	4	–	0	–	0	5	–	2	–	1
Butler +	4	–	0	–	0	4	–	4	–	1
Evansville	4	–	1	–	0	5	–	3	–	0
Rose Poly	4	–	1	–	0	5	–	3	–	0
Saint Joseph's (IN)	3	–	1	–	0	4	–	2	–	1
Indiana State	2	–	1	–	0	5	–	2	–	1
Wabash	4	–	2	–	0	4	–	4	–	1
DePauw	3	–	3	–	0	3	–	4	–	0
Ball State	2	–	3	–	0	3	–	4	–	1
Valparaiso	2	–	3	–	0	3	–	4	–	1
Hanover	1	–	4	–	0	1	–	8	–	0
Earlham	1	–	4	–	1	1	–	5	–	1
Central Normal	0	–	4	–	1	0	–	5	–	1
Franklin (IN)	0	–	7	–	0	0	–	8	–	0
+ – Conference co-champions

1940 Iowa Conference football standings
	Conf.					Overall
Team	W		L		T	W		L		T
Dubuque $	7	–	0	–	0	7	–	1	–	0
St. Ambrose *	2	–	0	–	1	8	–	0	–	1
Loras	4	–	1	–	1	6	–	2	–	2
Western Union	2	–	1	–	0	7	–	1	–	0
Central (IA)	5	–	3	–	0	6	–	3	–	0
Buena Vista	2	–	2	–	0	4	–	3	–	1
Parsons	3	–	3	–	1	4	–	4	–	1
Upper Iowa	3	–	3	–	0	3	–	3	–	0
Iowa Wesleyan	2	–	3	–	0	2	–	6	–	1
Luther	1	–	3	–	0	3	–	4	–	1
Simpson (IA)	1	–	4	–	1	1	–	7	–	1
Penn (IA)	1	–	5	–	0	2	–	6	–	0
Wartburg	0	–	5	–	0	0	–	6	–	0
$ – Conference champion; * – ineligible for conference title

1940 Kansas Collegiate Athletic Conference football standings
	Conf.					Overall
Team	W		L		T	W		L		T
Kansas Wesleyan $	5	–	0	–	1	6	–	1	–	2
Baker	4	–	2	–	0	5	–	3	–	0
Ottawa	3	–	2	–	1	4	–	4	–	1
Bethany (KS)	3	–	3	–	0	4	–	5	–	0
College of Emporia	2	–	4	–	0	2	–	6	–	1
McPherson	2	–	4	–	0	2	–	7	–	0
Bethel (KS)	1	–	5	–	0	4	–	6	–	0
$ – Conference champion

1940 Kentucky Intercollegiate Athletic Conference football standings
	Conf.					Overall
Team	W		L		T	W		L		T
Centre $	2	–	0	–	0	3	–	6	–	0
Eastern Kentucky	1	–	0	–	0	8	–	0	–	0
Western Kentucky State Teachers	1	–	0	–	1	7	–	1	–	1
Georgetown (KY)	2	–	1	–	0	5	–	3	–	2
Transylvania	1	–	2	–	1	5	–	3	–	1
Morehead State	1	–	1	–	2	3	–	2	–	2
Union (KY)	0	–	1	–	1	5	–	1	–	1
Murray State	0	–	1	–	1	4	–	3	–	2
Louisville	0	–	2	–	0	3	–	5	–	1
$ – Conference champion

1940 Lone Star Conference football standings
	Conf.					Overall
Team	W		L		T	W		L		T
North Texas State $	4	–	0	–	0	6	–	3	–	0
Sam Houston State	3	–	1	–	0	8	–	2	–	0
East Texas State	2	–	2	–	0	4	–	4	–	0
Stephen F. Austin	1	–	3	–	0	4	–	5	–	0
Southwest Texas State	0	–	4	–	0	3	–	5	–	1
$ – Conference champion

1940 Louisiana Intercollegiate Conference football standings
	Conf.					Overall
Team	W		L		T	W		L		T
Southwestern Louisiana $	4	–	0	–	0	6	–	3	–	1
Louisiana Normal	3	–	1	–	1	6	–	3	–	1
Louisiana Tech	3	–	2	–	0	6	–	4	–	0
Louisiana College	0	–	2	–	1	2	–	5	–	2
Centenary	0	–	2	–	0	3	–	7	–	0
Southeastern Louisiana	0	–	3	–	0	3	–	6	–	1
$ – Conference champion

1940 Michigan-Ontario Collegiate Conference football standings
	Conf.					Overall
Team	W		L		T	W		L		T
Lawrence Tech +	3	–	1	–	0	6	–	3	–	0
Assumption (ON) +	3	–	1	–	0	?	–	?	–	?
DeSales (OH) +	3	–	1	–	0	4	–	4	–	0
St. Mary's (MI)	1	–	3	–	0	2	–	3	–	0
Ferris Institute	0	–	4	–	0	1	–	7	–	0
+ – Conference co-champions

1940 Michigan Intercollegiate Athletic Association football standings
	Conf.					Overall
Team	W		L		T	W		L		T
Albion $	5	–	0	–	0	7	–	1	–	0
Alma	4	–	1	–	0	5	–	2	–	0
Hope	2	–	2	–	1	3	–	3	–	1
Hillsdale	2	–	2	–	1	2	–	4	–	1
Adrian	1	–	4	–	0	1	–	7	–	0
Kalamazoo	0	–	5	–	0	1	–	6	–	1
$ – Conference champion

1940 Midwest Conference football standings
	Conf.					Overall
Team	W		L		T	W		L		T
Beloit $	5	–	1	–	1	5	–	1	–	1
Carleton	4	–	1	–	1	6	–	1	–	1
Grinnell	4	–	2	–	0	5	–	4	–	0
Cornell (IA)	4	–	2	–	1	6	–	2	–	1
Knox	3	–	2	–	1	4	–	3	–	1
Ripon	2	–	3	–	1	3	–	4	–	1
Coe	3	–	5	–	0	3	–	5	–	0
Lawrence	2	–	5	–	0	2	–	5	–	0
Monmouth (IL)	0	–	6	–	1	0	–	7	–	2
$ – Conference champion

1940 Minnesota Intercollegiate Athletic Conference football standings
	Conf.					Overall
Team	W		L		T	W		L		T
Gustavus Adolphus $	5	–	0	–	0	7	–	1	–	0
St. Thomas (MN)	4	–	1	–	0	5	–	3	–	0
Macalester	4	–	1	–	1	5	–	1	–	1
Saint Mary's (MN)	4	–	2	–	0	5	–	3	–	0
Saint John's (MN)	2	–	3	–	1	4	–	3	–	1
Concordia (MN)	2	–	3	–	0	4	–	4	–	1
Hamline	2	–	4	–	0	2	–	4	–	0
Augsburg	0	–	4	–	0	1	–	5	–	0
St. Olaf	0	–	5	–	0	0	–	7	–	0
$ – Conference champion

1940 Missouri College Athletic Union football standings
	Conf.					Overall
Team	W		L		T	W		L		T
Culver–Stockton $	4	–	0	–	0	4	–	2	–	1
Central (MO)	2	–	1	–	1	2	–	5	–	1
Missouri Valley	2	–	2	–	0	2	–	5	–	1
William Jewell	1	–	2	–	1	1	–	7	–	1
Tarkio	0	–	4	–	0	1	–	6	–	0
$ – Conference champion

1940 Missouri Intercollegiate Athletic Association football standings
	Conf.					Overall
Team	W		L		T	W		L		T
Springfield (MO) $	5	–	0	–	0	10	–	0	–	0
Maryville (MO)	3	–	2	–	0	7	–	2	–	0
Missouri Mines	2	–	2	–	1	3	–	3	–	2
Warrensburg	2	–	3	–	0	5	–	4	–	0
Cape Girardeau	1	–	3	–	1	4	–	5	–	1
Kirksville	1	–	4	–	0	4	–	4	–	1
$ – Conference champion

1940 Missouri Valley Conference football standings
	Conf.					Overall
Team	W		L		T	W		L		T
Tulsa $	4	–	0	–	0	7	–	3	–	0
Oklahoma A&M	4	–	1	–	0	6	–	3	–	1
Creighton	2	–	2	–	0	6	–	2	–	2
Drake	2	–	2	–	0	4	–	5	–	0
Saint Louis	2	–	3	–	0	3	–	6	–	0
Washington University	1	–	3	–	0	3	–	6	–	0
Washburn	0	–	4	–	0	4	–	6	–	0
$ – Conference champion

1940 Nebraska College Athletic Conference football standings
	Conf.					Overall
Team	W		L		T	W		L		T
Doane +	3	–	0	–	1	5	–	2	–	1
Hastings +	3	–	0	–	1	4	–	4	–	1
Midland	2	–	2	–	0	3	–	6	–	0
Nebraska Wesleyan	1	–	3	–	0	1	–	7	–	0
York (NE)	0	–	4	–	0	1	–	8	–	0
+ – Conference co-champions

1940 Nebraska Intercollegiate Athletic Association football standings
	Conf.					Overall
Team	W		L		T	W		L		T
Peru State $	2	–	0	–	1	7	–	0	–	2
Kearney State	2	–	1	–	0	7	–	2	–	0
Chadron State	1	–	2	–	0	5	–	4	–	0
Wayne State (NE)	0	–	2	–	1	4	–	5	–	1
$ – Conference champion

1940 New England Conference football standings
	Conf.					Overall
Team	W		L		T	W		L		T
New Hampshire $	2	–	0	–	0	5	–	3	–	0
Rhode Island State	2	–	1	–	0	5	–	3	–	0
Connecticut	1	–	2	–	0	4	–	4	–	0
Maine	1	–	2	–	0	1	–	6	–	0
Northeastern	0	–	1	–	0	2	–	6	–	0
$ – Conference champion

1940 North Central Conference football standings
	Conf.					Overall
Team	W		L		T	W		L		T
Iowa State Teachers $	5	–	0	–	0	8	–	1	–	0
North Dakota	3	–	1	–	0	5	–	4	–	0
South Dakota	2	–	1	–	1	4	–	5	–	0
Morningside	2	–	2	–	1	3	–	2	–	2
South Dakota State	2	–	3	–	1	4	–	3	–	1
Omaha	1	–	3	–	1	2	–	3	–	2
North Dakota Agricultural	0	–	5	–	0	1	–	8	–	0
$ – Conference champion

1940 North Dakota Intercollegiate Conference football standings
	Conf.					Overall
Team	W		L		T	W		L		T
Mayville State $	5	–	1	–	0	5	–	3	–	0
Jamestown	3	–	1	–	1	4	–	2	–	1
Ellendale	2	–	1	–	2	2	–	2	–	2
Wahpeton	3	–	2	–	0	4	–	3	–	0
Dickinson State	3	–	2	–	1	3	–	3	–	1
Minot State	2	–	4	–	0	2	–	4	–	1
Valley City State	1	–	3	–	2	1	–	4	–	2
Bottineau	0	–	5	–	0	0	–	5	–	0
$ – Conference champion

1940 North State Conference football standings
	Conf.					Overall
Team	W		L		T	W		L		T
Catawba $	4	–	0	–	0	8	–	1	–	0
Elon	5	–	1	–	0	5	–	2	–	1
Lenoir Rhyne	4	–	2	–	0	6	–	3	–	0
Appalachian State	2	–	2	–	0	6	–	4	–	0
High Point	2	–	3	–	0	5	–	4	–	1
Western Carolina	1	–	4	–	0	2	–	5	–	1
Guilford	0	–	6	–	0	0	–	9	–	0
$ – Conference champion

1940 Northern Teachers College Conference football standings
	Conf.					Overall
Team	W		L		T	W		L		T
St. Cloud State $	4	–	0	–	0	5	–	2	–	0
Moorhead State	3	–	1	–	0	4	–	3	–	0
Bemidji State	3	–	2	–	0	4	–	2	–	1
Duluth State	2	–	3	–	0	2	–	5	–	0
Winona State	1	–	3	–	0	1	–	4	–	1
Mankato State	0	–	4	–	0	0	–	6	–	0
$ – Conference champion

1940 Northwest Conference football standings
	Conf.					Overall
Team	W		L		T	W		L		T
Willamette $	4	–	0	–	0	4	–	5	–	0
College of Idaho	2	–	0	–	2	4	–	2	–	2
Pacific (OR)	2	–	1	–	2	2	–	4	–	2
Puget Sound	2	–	2	–	1	3	–	3	–	1
Whitman	1	–	3	–	1	2	–	4	–	1
Linfield	0	–	5	–	0	1	–	7	–	0
$ – Conference champion

1940 Ohio Athletic Conference football standings
	Conf.					Overall
Team	W		L		T	W		L		T
Wittenberg $	7	–	0	–	0	8	–	0	–	0
Kent State	4	–	0	–	0	8	–	1	–	0
Case	3	–	0	–	0	6	–	2	–	0
Ohio Northern	5	–	3	–	0	5	–	3	–	0
Heidelberg	5	–	3	–	0	5	–	4	–	0
Capital	3	–	2	–	1	3	–	3	–	1
Denison	3	–	2	–	1	4	–	3	–	1
Wooster	3	–	2	–	1	4	–	3	–	1
Muskingum	3	–	2	–	0	5	–	2	–	1
Toledo	1	–	1	–	0	6	–	3	–	0
Baldwin–Wallace	2	–	2	–	0	4	–	4	–	0
Bowling Green	2	–	2	–	1	3	–	4	–	1
Kenyon	1	–	2	–	1	2	–	4	–	1
Findlay	1	–	2	–	0	4	–	4	–	0
Marietta	1	–	3	–	1	1	–	5	–	1
Otterbein	1	–	4	–	0	3	–	5	–	0
Oberlin	0	–	3	–	0	4	–	3	–	0
Ashland	0	–	3	–	0	1	–	4	–	1
John Carroll	0	–	3	–	0	2	–	6	–	0
Mount Union	0	–	6	–	0	0	–	8	–	1
$ – Conference champion

1940 Oklahoma Collegiate Conference football standings
	Conf.					Overall
Team	W		L		T	W		L		T
Oklahoma Baptist $	5	–	0	–	1	8	–	2	–	1
SW Oklahoma State	4	–	2	–	0	8	–	2	–	0
SE Oklahoma State	3	–	2	–	1	7	–	2	–	1
East Central	3	–	2	–	1	7	–	2	–	2
Central State (OK)	2	–	2	–	2	2	–	5	–	2
NW Oklahoma State	0	–	4	–	2	3	–	6	–	2
Northeastern State	0	–	5	–	1	0	–	8	–	1
$ – Conference champion

1940 Pennsylvania State Teachers Conference football standings
	Conf.					Overall
Team	W		L		T	W		L		T
Millersville +	4	–	0	–	0	7	–	0	–	0
Indiana (PA) +	7	–	0	–	1	7	–	0	–	1
West Chester	2	–	0	–	0	5	–	2	–	1
East Stroudsburg	4	–	1	–	0	7	–	1	–	0
Clarion	2	–	1	–	0	4	–	3	–	0
Slippery Rock	1	–	1	–	1	4	–	3	–	1
Kutztown	2	–	2	–	0	3	–	5	–	0
Shippensburg	2	–	3	–	2	3	–	3	–	2
Mansfield	2	–	4	–	0	3	–	4	–	0
California (PA)	1	–	2	–	0	1	–	5	–	0
Lock Haven	2	–	5	–	0	2	–	7	–	0
Bloomsburg	1	–	6	–	0	1	–	6	–	0
Edinboro	0	–	5	–	0	0	–	7	–	0
+ – Conference co-champions

1940 Rocky Mountain Conference football standings
	Conf.					Overall
Team	W		L		T	W		L		T
Colorado College $	2	–	0	–	1	5	–	2	–	1
Colorado Mines	3	–	1	–	0	3	–	4	–	0
Montana State	2	–	1	–	0	4	–	4	–	0
Colorado State–Greeley	1	–	3	–	0	2	–	5	–	1
Western State (CO)	0	–	3	–	1	2	–	6	–	1
$ – Conference champion

1940 Smoky Mountain Conference football standings
	Conf.					Overall
Team	W		L		T	W		L		T
Milligan $	5	–	0	–	0	9	–	0	–	0
Carson–Newman	4	–	1	–	0	4	–	4	–	0
East Tennessee State Teachers	3	–	3	–	0	4	–	4	–	0
Maryville	2	–	3	–	0	5	–	5	–	0
Cumberland (TN)	1	–	4	–	0	1	–	9	–	0
Tusculum	0	–	4	–	0	1	–	7	–	0
$ – Conference champion

1940 South Dakota Intercollegiate Conference football standings
	Conf.					Overall
Team	W		L		T	W		L		T
Northern State $	3	–	0	–	0	7	–	2	–	0
Spearfish	2	–	0	–	1	4	–	2	–	2
South Dakota Mines	1	–	1	–	1	2	–	5	–	1
Eastern Normal	1	–	2	–	0	1	–	5	–	0
Southern Normal	0	–	4	–	0	0	–	8	–	0
$ – Conference champion

1940 Southern California Conference football standings
	Conf.					Overall
Team	W		L		T	W		L		T
Redlands $	3	–	0	–	1	4	–	4	–	1
Pomona	3	–	1	–	0	4	–	4	–	0
Occidental	2	–	2	–	0	3	–	4	–	1
Whittier	1	–	2	–	1	2	–	6	–	1
Caltech	0	–	4	–	0	2	–	5	–	1
$ – Conference champion

1940 Southern Intercollegiate Athletic Association football standings
	Conf.					Overall
Team	W		L		T	W		L		T
Rollins $	6	–	0	–	0	8	–	1	–	0
Newberry	4	–	0	–	0	7	–	2	–	1
Mississippi College	2	–	0	–	0	5	–	1	–	1
Eastern Kentucky	1	–	0	–	0	8	–	0	–	0
Western Kentucky State Teachers	4	–	1	–	1	7	–	1	–	1
Louisiana Normal	4	–	1	–	1	6	–	3	–	1
SW Louisiana	4	–	1	–	0	6	–	3	–	1
Union (TN)	3	–	1	–	0	6	–	3	–	0
Georgetown (KY)	2	–	1	–	0	5	–	3	–	2
Murray State	4	–	2	–	1	4	–	3	–	2
Centre	2	–	1	–	0	3	–	6	–	0
Miami (FL)	2	–	1	–	0	3	–	7	–	0
Presbyterian	5	–	3	–	0	6	–	4	–	0
Mississippi Southern	3	–	2	–	0	7	–	4	–	0
Louisiana Tech	3	–	2	–	0	6	–	4	–	0
West Tennessee State Teachers	4	–	3	–	0	5	–	5	–	0
Morehead State	1	–	1	–	2	3	–	3	–	2
Wofford	2	–	2	–	1	3	–	4	–	2
Middle Tennessee State Teachers	2	–	4	–	0	4	–	4	–	0
Tampa	2	–	4	–	0	3	–	6	–	0
Oglethorpe	2	–	4	–	0	2	–	6	–	0
Tennessee Tech	1	–	2	–	0	2	–	6	–	0
Transylvania	1	–	2	–	1	5	–	3	–	1
Stetson	2	–	5	–	1	2	–	5	–	1
Troy State	1	–	3	–	0	3	–	6	–	0
Louisiana College	1	–	4	–	2	2	–	5	–	2
Union (KY)	0	–	1	–	1	5	–	1	–	1
Centenary	0	–	2	–	0	3	–	7	–	0
Louisville	0	–	2	–	0	3	–	5	–	1
Jacksonville State	0	–	2	–	0	3	–	5	–	0
Erskine	0	–	5	–	0	1	–	8	–	0
Delta State	0	–	5	–	1	0	–	8	–	2
$ – Conference champion

1940 Southern Intercollegiate Athletic Conference football standings
	Conf.					Overall
Team	W		L		T	W		L		T
Morris Brown $	6	–	1	–	0	9	–	1	–	0
Alabama State	5	–	2	–	0	7	–	2	–	0
Florida A&M	5	–	1	–	0	6	–	1	–	3
Xavier (LA)	3	–	3	–	0	4	–	4	–	0
Tuskegee	4	–	3	–	0	5	–	4	–	0
Clark (GA)	4	–	2	–	0	6	–	3	–	0
Lane	2	–	2	–	1	5	–	3	–	1
Knoxville	2	–	3	–	1	?	–	?	–	?
Morehouse	1	–	5	–	1	1	–	6	–	1
Benedict	1	–	4	–	1	?	–	?	–	?
South Carolina State	1	–	5	–	0	3	–	6	–	0
LeMoyne *	2	–	1	–	0	?	–	?	–	?
Talladega *	1	–	2	–	0	?	–	?	–	?
Fisk *	0	–	3	–	0	?	–	?	–	?
$ – Conference champion; * Conference standings were based on the Dickinson System. Teams that played less than five conference games did not figure in final standings.

1940 Southwestern Athletic Conference football standings
	Conf.					Overall
Team	W		L		T	W		L		T
Southern +	5	–	1	–	0	8	–	1	–	0
Langston +	5	–	1	–	0	6	–	3	–	0
Prairie View	4	–	2	–	0	6	–	3	–	0
Texas College	3	–	2	–	1	4	–	2	–	1
Bishop	2	–	4	–	0	4	–	4	–	0
Wiley	1	–	4	–	1	3	–	5	–	1
Arkansas AM&N	0	–	6	–	0	3	–	8	–	0
+ – Conference co-champions

1940 Texas Conference football standings
	Conf.					Overall
Team	W		L		T	W		L		T
Abilene Christian +	5	–	1	–	0	7	–	2	–	0
Texas Wesleyan +	5	–	1	–	0	7	–	2	–	0
Howard Payne +	5	–	1	–	0	6	–	4	–	0
Austin	4	–	3	–	0	5	–	5	–	0
Trinity (TX)	4	–	3	–	0	4	–	5	–	1
Southwestern (TX)	2	–	5	–	0	5	–	6	–	0
McMurry	1	–	6	–	0	1	–	9	–	0
Daniel Baker	0	–	6	–	0	0	–	11	–	0
+ – Conference co-champions

1940 Washington Intercollegiate Conference football standings
	Conf.					Overall
Team	W		L		T	W		L		T
Pacific Lutheran $	4	–	0	–	0	8	–	0	–	0
Eastern Washington	3	–	1	–	0	6	–	2	–	0
Central Washington	2	–	2	–	0	4	–	3	–	0
Western Washington	1	–	3	–	0	3	–	4	–	0
Saint Martin's	0	–	4	–	0	1	–	6	–	0
$ – Conference champion

1940 West Virginia Intercollegiate Athletic Conference football standings
	Conf.					Overall
Team	W		L		T	W		L		T
West Liberty State $	4	–	0	–	0	6	–	2	–	0
Concord	5	–	1	–	0	8	–	1	–	0
Morris Harvey	4	–	1	–	1	6	–	3	–	1
West Virginia Wesleyan	3	–	2	–	0	3	–	5	–	0
Bethany (WV)	2	–	2	–	0	6	–	2	–	0
Fairmont State	2	–	4	–	1	3	–	4	–	1
Glenville State	2	–	4	–	0	2	–	5	–	1
New River State	1	–	2	–	1	0	–	2	–	3
Potomac State	1	–	4	–	0	1	–	8	–	0
Salem	1	–	6	–	0	2	–	8	–	0
Marshall *	2	–	0	–	0	8	–	2	–	0
Davis & Elkins *	1	–	1	–	1	1	–	7	–	1
Shepherd *	1	–	2	–	0	1	–	5	–	0
$ – Conference champion; * – Did not qualify for conference standings Ties did not count in conference standings.

1940 Wisconsin State Teachers College Conference football standings
	Conf.					Overall
Team	W		L		T	W		L		T
Northern Division
La Crosse State x	4	–	0	–	0	6	–	0	–	0
Superior State	3	–	1	–	0	6	–	1	–	0
River Falls State	2	–	2	–	0	4	–	3	–	0
Stout Institute	0	–	3	–	1	1	–	5	–	1
Eau Claire State	0	–	3	–	1	0	–	5	–	3
Southern Division
Whitewater State x	4	–	0	–	0	5	–	2	–	0
Stevens Point State	3	–	1	–	0	5	–	2	–	1
Milwaukee State	2	–	2	–	0	4	–	4	–	0
Platteville State	1	–	3	–	0	1	–	4	–	0
Oshkosh State	0	–	4	–	0	1	–	5	–	0
x – Division champion/co-champions

== Heisman Trophy voting ==
The Heisman Trophy is given to the year's most outstanding player

Player	School	Position	Total
Tom Harmon	Michigan	HB	1,303
John Kimbrough	Texas A&M	FB	841
George Franck	Minnesota	HB	102
Frankie Albert	Stanford	QB	90
Paul Christman	Missouri	QB	66

== Bowl games ==
Bowl game	Winning team		Losing team	
Rose Bowl	No. 2 Stanford	21	No. 7 Nebraska	13
Sugar Bowl	No. 5 Boston College	19	No. 4 Tennessee	13
Orange Bowl	No. 9 Mississippi State	14	No. 13 Georgetown	7
Cotton Bowl Classic	No. 6 Texas A&M	20	No. 12 Fordham	12
Sun Bowl	Western Reserve	26	Arizona State	13

== See also ==
- 1940 College Football All-America Team
