= 1940 The Citadel Bulldogs football team =

American college football season

1940 The Citadel Bulldogs football
- Conference: Southern Conference
- Record: 4–5 (0–4 SoCon)
- Head coach: Bo Rowland (1st season)
- Home stadium: Johnson Hagood Stadium

1940 Southern Conference football standings
	Conf.					Overall
Team	W		L		T	W		L		T
Clemson $	4	–	0	–	0	6	–	2	–	1
No. 18 Duke	4	–	1	–	0	7	–	2	–	0
Wake Forest	4	–	2	–	0	7	–	3	–	0
William & Mary	2	–	1	–	1	6	–	2	–	1
North Carolina	3	–	2	–	0	6	–	4	–	0
Richmond	3	–	2	–	0	7	–	3	–	0
VMI	3	–	2	–	1	7	–	2	–	1
Furman	4	–	3	–	0	5	–	4	–	0
Washington and Lee	1	–	1	–	1	2	–	7	–	1
VPI	2	–	3	–	0	5	–	5	–	0
NC State	3	–	5	–	0	3	–	6	–	0
Maryland	0	–	1	–	1	2	–	6	–	1
South Carolina	1	–	3	–	0	3	–	6	–	0
Davidson	1	–	5	–	0	5	–	5	–	0
The Citadel	0	–	4	–	0	4	–	5	–	0
$ – Conference champion; Rankings from AP Poll

The 1940 The Citadel Bulldogs football team represented The Citadel, The Military College of South Carolina in the 1940 college football season. Bo Rowland served as head coach for the first season. The Bulldogs played as members of the Southern Conference and played home games at Johnson Hagood Stadium.

== Schedule ==
Date	Time	Opponent	Site	Result	Attendance	Source
October 4		Erskine*	Johnson Hagood Stadium; Charleston, SC	W 45–0		
October 11		at Furman	Sirrine Stadium; Greenville, SC (rivalry)	L 7–36	3,500	
October 18	2:30 p.m.	vs. Presbyterian*	Sumter County Fairgrounds; Sumter, SC	L 0–19	2,500	
October 26		Oglethorpe*	Johnson Hagood Stadium; Charleston, SC	W 25–0	4,000	
November 1		vs. Wofford*	Orangeburg County Fairgrounds; Orangeburg, SC (rivalry)	W 7–3	5,000	
November 16		NC State	Johnson Hagood Stadium; Charleston, SC	L 14–20	3,500	
November 23		Sewanee*	Johnson Hagood Stadium; Charleston, SC	W 13–7	2,500	
November 30		vs. Davidson	Legion Stadium; Wilmington, NC	L 6–20	5,000	
December 7		South Carolina	Johnson Hagood Stadium; Charleston, SC	L 6–31	6,000	
*Non-conference game; All times are in Eastern time
