= 1940 William & Mary Indians football team =

American college football season

1940 William & Mary Indians football
- Conference: Southern Conference
- Record: 6–2–1 (2–1–1 SoCon)
- Head coach: Carl M. Voyles (2nd season)
- Captain: Charles Gondak
- Home stadium: Cary Field

1940 Southern Conference football standings
	Conf.					Overall
Team	W		L		T	W		L		T
Clemson $	4	–	0	–	0	6	–	2	–	1
No. 18 Duke	4	–	1	–	0	7	–	2	–	0
Wake Forest	4	–	2	–	0	7	–	3	–	0
William & Mary	2	–	1	–	1	6	–	2	–	1
North Carolina	3	–	2	–	0	6	–	4	–	0
Richmond	3	–	2	–	0	7	–	3	–	0
VMI	3	–	2	–	1	7	–	2	–	1
Furman	4	–	3	–	0	5	–	4	–	0
Washington and Lee	1	–	1	–	1	2	–	7	–	1
VPI	2	–	3	–	0	5	–	5	–	0
NC State	3	–	5	–	0	3	–	6	–	0
Maryland	0	–	1	–	1	2	–	6	–	1
South Carolina	1	–	3	–	0	3	–	6	–	0
Davidson	1	–	5	–	0	5	–	5	–	0
The Citadel	0	–	4	–	0	4	–	5	–	0
$ – Conference champion; Rankings from AP Poll

The 1940 William & Mary Indians football team represented the College of William & Mary as a member of the Southern Conference (SoCon) during the 1940 college football season. Led by second-year head coach Carl M. Voyles, the Indians compiled an overall record of 6–2–1 with a mark of 2–1–1 in conference play, and finished fourth in the SoCon. William & Mary played home games at Cary Field in Williamsburg, Virginia.

William & Mary was ranked at No. 87 (out of 697 college football teams) in the final rankings under the Litkenhous Difference by Score system for 1940.

== Schedule ==
Date	Opponent	Site	Result	Attendance	Source
September 20	vs. NC State	Foreman Field; Norfolk, VA	L 0–16	17,000	
September 28	at Navy*	Thompson Stadium; Annapolis, MD	L 7–19	18,000	
October 5	Apprentice*	Cary Field; Williamsburg, VA	W 42–0		
October 12	vs. VPI	City Stadium; Richmond, VA	W 20–13	9,000	
October 19	Hapmden–Sydney*	Cary Field; Williamsburg, VA	W 41–0	3,000	
October 26	Virginia*^{†}	Cary Field; Williamsburg, VA	W 13–6	11,000	
November 2	at VMI	Alumni Field; Lexington, VA (rivalry)	T 0–0	6,000	
November 9	Randolph–Macon*	Cary Field; Williamsburg, VA	W 46–6		
November 21	at Richmond	City Stadium; Richmond, VA (rivalry)	W 16–0	18,000	
*Non-conference game; ^{†}Homecoming
