= 1940 Maryland Terrapins football team =

American college football season

1940 Maryland Terrapins football
- Conference: Southern Conference
- Record: 2–6–1 (0–1–1 SoCon)
- Head coach: Jack Faber (2nd season)
- Home stadium: Byrd Stadium (original)

1940 Southern Conference football standings
	Conf.					Overall
Team	W		L		T	W		L		T
Clemson $	4	–	0	–	0	6	–	2	–	1
No. 18 Duke	4	–	1	–	0	7	–	2	–	0
Wake Forest	4	–	2	–	0	7	–	3	–	0
William & Mary	2	–	1	–	1	6	–	2	–	1
North Carolina	3	–	2	–	0	6	–	4	–	0
Richmond	3	–	2	–	0	7	–	3	–	0
VMI	3	–	2	–	1	7	–	2	–	1
Furman	4	–	3	–	0	5	–	4	–	0
Washington and Lee	1	–	1	–	1	2	–	7	–	1
VPI	2	–	3	–	0	5	–	5	–	0
NC State	3	–	5	–	0	3	–	6	–	0
Maryland	0	–	1	–	1	2	–	6	–	1
South Carolina	1	–	3	–	0	3	–	6	–	0
Davidson	1	–	5	–	0	5	–	5	–	0
The Citadel	0	–	4	–	0	4	–	5	–	0
$ – Conference champion; Rankings from AP Poll

The 1940 Maryland Terrapins football team represented the University of Maryland in the 1940 college football season. In their second season under head coach Jack Faber, the Terrapins compiled a 2–6–1 record (0–1–1 in conference), finished in 12th place in the Southern Conference, and were outscored by their opponents 171 to 39.

Maryland was ranked at No. 189 (out of 697 college football teams) in the final rankings under the Litkenhous Difference by Score system for 1940.

== Schedule ==
Date	Opponent	Site	Result	Attendance	Source
September 28	Hampden–Sydney*	Byrd Stadium; College Park, MD	L 6–7	5,000	
October 5	at Penn*	Franklin Field; Philadelphia, PA	L 0–51	52,000	
October 12	Virginia*	Byrd Stadium; College Park, MD	L 6–19		
October 19	at Florida*	Florida Field; Gainesville, FL	L 0–19	10,000	
October 25	vs. Western Maryland*	10,000; Baltimore, MD	W 6–0		
November 9	No. 9 Georgetown*	Byrd Stadium; College Park, MD	L 0–41	9,000	
November 16	vs. VMI	City Stadium; Lynchburg, VA	L 0–20	1,500	
November 21	Rutgers*	Baltimore, MD	W 14–7	5,000	
November 30	Washington and Lee	Byrd Stadium; College Park, MD	T 7–7	4,000	
*Non-conference game; Rankings from AP Poll released prior to the game
