= 1940 Washington and Lee Generals football team =

American college football season

1940 Washington and Lee Generals football
- Conference: Southern Conference
- Record: 2–7–1 (1–1–1 SoCon)
- Head coach: Warren E. Tilson (8th season)
- Home stadium: Wilson Field

1940 Southern Conference football standings
	Conf.					Overall
Team	W		L		T	W		L		T
Clemson $	4	–	0	–	0	6	–	2	–	1
No. 18 Duke	4	–	1	–	0	7	–	2	–	0
Wake Forest	4	–	2	–	0	7	–	3	–	0
William & Mary	2	–	1	–	1	6	–	2	–	1
North Carolina	3	–	2	–	0	6	–	4	–	0
Richmond	3	–	2	–	0	7	–	3	–	0
VMI	3	–	2	–	1	7	–	2	–	1
Furman	4	–	3	–	0	5	–	4	–	0
Washington and Lee	1	–	1	–	1	2	–	7	–	1
VPI	2	–	3	–	0	5	–	5	–	0
NC State	3	–	5	–	0	3	–	6	–	0
Maryland	0	–	1	–	1	2	–	6	–	1
South Carolina	1	–	3	–	0	3	–	6	–	0
Davidson	1	–	5	–	0	5	–	5	–	0
The Citadel	0	–	4	–	0	4	–	5	–	0
$ – Conference champion; Rankings from AP Poll

The 1940 Washington and Lee Generals football team was an American football team that represented Washington and Lee University during the 1940 college football season as a member of the Southern Conference. In their eighth year under head coach Warren E. Tilson, the team compiled an overall record of 2–7–1, with a mark of 1–1–1 in conference play.

Washington and Lee was ranked at No. 175 (out of 697 college football teams) in the final rankings under the Litkenhous Difference by Score system for 1940.

== Schedule ==
Date	Time	Opponent	Site	Result	Attendance	Source
September 21		Hampden–Sydney*	Wilson Field; Lexington, VA	W 26–0	4,500	
September 28		at Vanderbilt*	Dudley Field; Nashville, TN	L 0–19	9,000	
October 5		at Kentucky*	Stoll Field; Lexington, KY	L 12–47	10,000	
October 12		George Washington*	Wilson Field; Lexington, VA	L 14–20	5,000	
October 19		at Richmond	City Stadium; Richmond, VA	W 3–0	5,000	
October 26	2:30 p.m.	vs. VPI	Municipal Stadium; Lynchburg, VA	L 0–21	6,000	
November 2		vs. West Virginia*	Laidley Field; Charleston, WV	L 7–12		
November 9		at Virginia*	Scott Stadium; Charlottesville, VA	L 6–20		
November 16		vs. Sewanee*	Chamberlain Field; Chattanooga, TN	L 13–25	1,500	
November 30		at Maryland	Byrd Stadium; College Park, MD	T 7–7	4,000	
*Non-conference game
