= 1940 Marshall Thundering Herd football team =

American college football season

1940 Marshall Thundering Herd football
- Conference: West Virginia Intercollegiate Athletic Conference
- Record: 8–2 (2–0 WVIAC)
- Head coach: Cam Henderson (6th season)
- Captains: Jim Roberts; Andy D'Antoni
- Home stadium: Fairfield Stadium

1940 West Virginia Intercollegiate Athletic Conference football standings
	Conf.					Overall
Team	W		L		T	W		L		T
West Liberty State $	4	–	0	–	0	6	–	2	–	0
Concord	5	–	1	–	0	8	–	1	–	0
Morris Harvey	4	–	1	–	1	6	–	3	–	1
West Virginia Wesleyan	3	–	2	–	0	3	–	5	–	0
Bethany (WV)	2	–	2	–	0	6	–	2	–	0
Fairmont State	2	–	4	–	1	3	–	4	–	1
Glenville State	2	–	4	–	0	2	–	5	–	1
New River State	1	–	2	–	1	0	–	2	–	3
Potomac State	1	–	4	–	0	1	–	8	–	0
Salem	1	–	6	–	0	2	–	8	–	0
Marshall *	2	–	0	–	0	8	–	2	–	0
Davis & Elkins *	1	–	1	–	1	1	–	7	–	1
Shepherd *	1	–	2	–	0	1	–	5	–	0
$ – Conference champion; * – Did not qualify for conference standings Ties did not count in conference standings.

The 1940 Marshall Thundering Herd football team was an American football team that represented Marshall University as a member of the West Virginia Intercollegiate Athletic Conference during the 1940 college football season. In its sixth season under head coach Cam Henderson, the team compiled an 8–2 record and outscored opponents by a total of 334 to 75. Marshall had a 2–0 record against WVIAC opponents, but did not play enough conference games to qualify for the WVAC standings. Jim Roberts and Andy D'Antoni were the team captains. Jackie Hunt set a new single-season college football record with 27 touchdowns scored.

Marshall was ranked at No. 34 (out of 697 college football teams) in the final rankings under the Litkenhous Difference by Score system for 1940.

== Schedule ==
Date	Opponent	Site	Result	Attendance	Source
September 21	Morehead State*	Fairfield Stadium; Huntington, WV	W 13–6	6,000	
September 28	VPI*	Fairfield Stadium; Huntington, WV	W 13–7	8,000	
October 5	Dayton*	Fairfield Stadium; Huntington, WV	W 25–12		
October 12	at Toledo*	Glass Bowl; Toledo, OH	L 6–7	9,000	
October 19	at Wake Forest*	Groves Stadium; Wake Forest, NC	L 19–31	5,000	
October 26	Scranton*	Fairfield Stadium; Huntington, WV	W 50–6	7,500	
November 1	Morris Harvey	Fairfield Stadium; Huntington, WV	W 33–6		
November 8	Detroit Tech*	Fairfield Stadium; Huntington, WV	W 67–0	4,000	
November 16	Xavier*	Fairfield Stadium; Huntington, WV	W 41–0	6,000	
November 21	West Virginia Wesleyan^{†}	Fairfield Stadium; Huntington, WV	W 67–0	6,000	
*Non-conference game; ^{†}Homecoming
