= DeSales College =

Private Catholic college in Toledo, Ohio, US

DeSales College was a private Catholic college located in Toledo, Ohio. It opened in 1936 and closed in 1942.

DeSales College was formed with the consolidation of St. John's University and Toledo Diocesan College and occupied the campus of St. John's High School and College. It opened on September 21, 1936. The school's president, Monsignor Francis Macelwane, announced that the school had 30 full-time instructors teaching in 20 departments. Macelwane died suddenly from a heart attack, on December 5, 1940, at Calvert Hall, a dormitory on the school's campus. DeSales closed in June 1942. Enlistments and drafting into military service during World War II led to declining enrollment.

DeSales College's sports teams were known as the Sailors. The school's colors were vermillion red and royal blue. The 1939 football team, the first fielded by the school, went undefeated and was champion of the Michigan-Ontario Collegiate Conference (MOCC). The following season, in 1940, DeSales was co-champion of the MOCC with Assumption of Windsor, Ontario and Lawrence Tech of Highland Park, Michigan.

== Notable alumni ==
- Lee Knorek, professional basketball player
- Mary Sherman Morgan, rocket scientist
