= Angelo Paternoster =

American football player (1919–2012)

Profile
- Position: Guard

Personal information
- Born: February 20, 1919; Passaic, New Jersey
- Died: July 6, 2012 (aged 93)

Career information
- College: Georgetown

Career history
- 1943: Washington Redskins

Angelo Paternoster (February 20, 1919 – July 6, 2012) was an American football guard in the National Football League for the Washington Redskins. He was born in Passaic, New Jersey, and attended Georgetown University in Washington, D.C. Paternoster ceased activities with the Redskins due to commitments with the United States Navy. After World War II, Paternoster moved to Clifton, New Jersey and practiced dentistry. He died on July 6, 2012.
