= Michigan-Ontario Collegiate Conference =

College sports conference, 1930–1942

The Michigan-Ontario Collegiate Conference (MOCC) was an intercollegiate athletic conference that existed from 1930 to 1942. The league had members in the states of Michigan and Ohio as well as the Canadian province of Ontario. Calvin College (now known as Calvin University) of Grand Rapids, Michigan and Ferris Institute (now known as Ferris State University) of Big Rapids, Michigan joined the conference in late 1936 in time for the basketball season that winter.

== Football champions ==
- 1930 – Adrian
- 1931 – Adrian
- 1932 – Adrian and St. Mary's (MI)
- 1933 – Adrian and Lawrence Tech
- 1934 – Adrian
- 1935 – Adrian
- 1936 – Adrian
- 1937 – Ferris Institute and Lawrence Tech
- 1938 – Lawrence Tech
- 1939 – DeSales (OH)
- 1940 – Assumption (ON), DeSales (OH), and Lawrence Tech
- 1941 – Lawrence Tech

== Yearly football standings ==
1931 Michigan-Ontario Collegiate Conference football standings
	Conf.					Overall
Team	W		L		T	W		L		T
Adrian $	4	–	0	–	0	5	–	4	–	0
Detroit Tech	2	–	1	–	1	3	–	3	–	1
General Motors Tech	2	–	2	–	0	2	–	5	–	2
Assumption (ON)	1	–	2	–	1	?	–	?	–	?
St. Mary's (MI)	0	–	4	–	0	1	–	6	–	0
$ – Conference champion

1932 Michigan-Ontario Collegiate Conference football standings
	Conf.					Overall
Team	W		L		T	W		L		T
St. Mary's (MI) +	2	–	0	–	1	3	–	2	–	1
Adrian +	2	–	0	–	1	2	–	6	–	1
Assumption (ON)	0	–	2	–	1	?	–	?	–	?
Detroit Tech	0	–	2	–	1	?	–	?	–	?
+ – Conference co-champions

1935 Michigan-Ontario Collegiate Conference football standings
	Conf.					Overall
Team	W		L		T	W		L		T
Adrian $	3	–	0	–	0	7	–	3	–	0
Assumption (ON)	1	–	1	–	1	?	–	?	–	?
St. Mary's (MI)	1	–	1	–	1	1	–	4	–	1
Lawrence Tech	0	–	3	–	0	0	–	7	–	0
$ – Conference champion

1937 Michigan-Ontario Collegiate Conference football standings
	Conf.					Overall
Team	W		L		T	W		L		T
Lawrence Tech +	2	–	0	–	1	4	–	1	–	1
Ferris Institute	2	–	0	–	1	2	–	3	–	2
St. Mary's (MI)	1	–	2	–	0	2	–	5	–	0
Assumption (ON)	0	–	3	–	0	?	–	?	–	?
$ – Conference champion

1938 Michigan-Ontario Collegiate Conference football standings
	Conf.					Overall
Team	W		L		T	W		L		T
Lawrence Tech $	3	–	0	–	0	3	–	4	–	0
St. Mary's (MI)	1	–	1	–	1	1	–	4	–	2
Ferris Institute	0	–	1	–	2	0	–	5	–	2
Assumption (ON)	0	–	2	–	1	?	–	?	–	?
$ – Conference champion

1939 Michigan-Ontario Collegiate Conference football standings
	Conf.					Overall
Team	W		L		T	W		L		T
DeSales (OH) $	4	–	0	–	0	6	–	0	–	0
Lawrence Tech	2	–	2	–	0	4	–	4	–	0
Ferris Institute	2	–	2	–	0	2	–	6	–	0
Assumption (ON)	2	–	2	–	0	?	–	?	–	?
St. Mary's (MI)	0	–	4	–	0	0	–	6	–	0
$ – Conference champion

1940 Michigan-Ontario Collegiate Conference football standings
	Conf.					Overall
Team	W		L		T	W		L		T
Lawrence Tech +	3	–	1	–	0	6	–	3	–	0
Assumption (ON) +	3	–	1	–	0	?	–	?	–	?
DeSales (OH) +	3	–	1	–	0	4	–	4	–	0
St. Mary's (MI)	1	–	3	–	0	2	–	3	–	0
Ferris Institute	0	–	4	–	0	1	–	7	–	0
+ – Conference co-champions

== See also ==
- List of defunct college football conferences
