= List of East Carolina Pirates head football coaches =

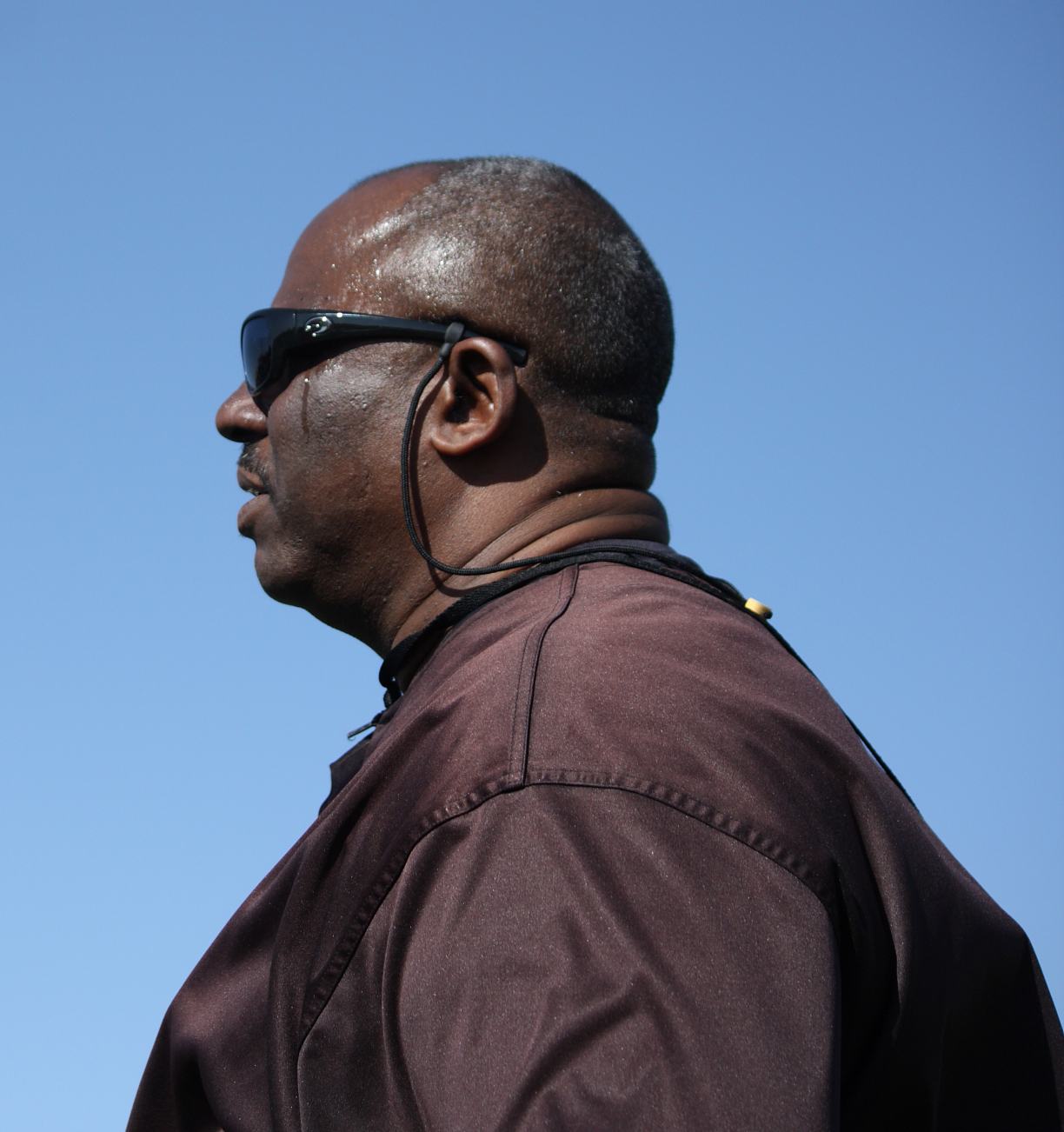
The 20th head football coach at East Carolina University, Ruffin McNeill

There have been 23 head coaches for the East Carolina Pirates. East Carolina started organized football with the nickname Teachers, in 1932. The school changed the nickname to the Pirates on February 26, 1934.

East Carolina has played in more than 800 games in a total of 84 seasons, 42 of which are in Division I-A. In those games, seven coaches have brought the Pirates to bowl games: Jack Boone in 1952 and 1954, Clarence Stasavich in 1963, 1964 and 1965, Pat Dye in 1978, Bill Lewis in 1991, Steve Logan in 1994, 1995, 1999, 2000 and 2001, Skip Holtz in 2006, 2007, 2008 and 2009, and Ruffin McNeill in 2010, 2012, 2013 and 2014. Five coaches have won conference championships with the Pirates: Jack Boone in 1953, Clarence Stasavich in 1966, Sonny Randle in 1972 and 1973, Pat Dye in 1976, and Skip Holtz in 2008 and 2009. Steve Logan is the all-time leader in games coached, years coached, and wins, while John Christenbury leads all coaches in winning percentage with 0.867. O. A. Hankner is statistically the worst coach the Pirates have had in terms of winning percentage, with .000.

Of the 22 Pirate coaches, Mike McGee and Pat Dye have been inducted to the College Football Hall of Fame. Two coaches, Clarence Stasavich and Bill Lewis, have received National Coach of the Year honors. Three former players have been head coach for the Pirates: Jim Johnson, Ed Emory and Ruffin McNeill. In addition, former players have become Pirate assistant coaches, such as Junior Smith and Paul Troth. The current coach is Blake Harrell. Statistics correct as of December 3, 2021, after the end of the 2021–22 college football season. East Carolina changed from East Carolina Teachers College to East Carolina College in 1951 and to East Carolina University in 1967.

== Key ==
^ Elected to the College Football Hall of Fame
* Spent entire professional head coaching career with Pirates

#	Number of coaches
GC	Games Coached
W	Wins
L	Loses
T	Ties
W–L %	Win–loss percentage

== Coaches ==
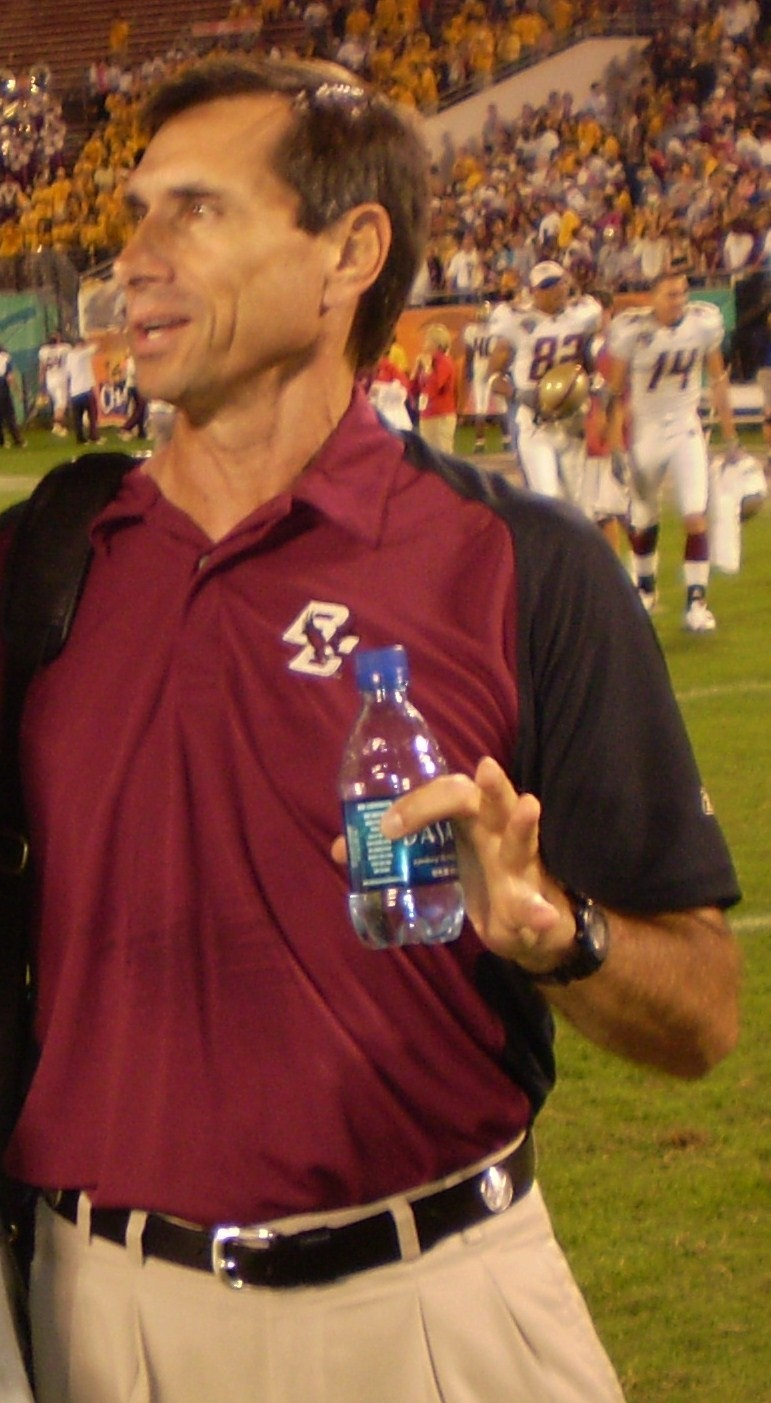
Former coach, Steve Logan

#	Name	Term	Regular season					Postseason			Awards
#	Name	Term	GC	W	L	T	W–L %	GC	W	L	Awards
East Carolina Teachers College Teachers
1	Kenneth Beatty*	1932–1933	11	1	10	0	0.091	–	–	–	–
East Carolina Teachers College Pirates
2	G.L. "Doc" Mathis*	1934–1935	12	4	7	1	0.375	–	–	–	–
3	Bo Farley*	1936	5	3	2	0	0.600	–	–	–	–
4	J. D. Alexander	1937–1938	15	3	11	1	0.233	–	–	–	–
5	O. A. Hankner*	1939	8	0	8	0	0.000	–	–	–	–
6	John Christenbury*	1940–1941	15	12	3	0	0.800	–	–	–	–
7	Jim Johnson*	1946–1948	27	8	18	1	0.315	–	–	–	–
East Carolina College Pirates
8	Bill Dole	1949–1951	30	15	14	1	0.517	–	–	–	–
9	Jack Boone*	1952–1961	97	49	43	5	0.520	2	0	2	–
East Carolina University Pirates
10	Clarence Stasavich	1962–1969	75	47	27	1	0.647	3	3	0	1964 NAIA Coach of the Year
11	Mike McGee^	1970	11	3	8	0	0.273	–	–	–	–
12	Sonny Randle	1971–1973	32	22	10	0	0.688	–	–	–	1972 Southern Conference Media Coach-of-the-Year; 1973 Southern Conference Media Coach-of-the-Year
13	Pat Dye^	1974–1979	66	47	18	1	0.724	1	1	0	–
14	Ed Emory*	1980–1984	55	26	29	0	0.473	–	–	–	–
15	Art Baker	1985–1988	44	13	31	0	0.295	–	–	–	–
16	Bill Lewis	1989–1991	33	21	12	0	0.647	1	1	0	1991 National Coach-of-the-Year
17	Steve Logan*	1992–2002	122	67	55	0	0.543	5	2	3	–
18	John Thompson*	2003–2004	23	3	20	0	0.130	–	–	–	–
19	Skip Holtz	2005–2009	61	37	24	0	0.607	4	1	3	–
20	Ruffin McNeill	2010–2015	59	35	24	0	0.593	3	1	2	–
21	Scottie Montgomery	2016–2018	35	9	26	0	0.257	–	–	–	–
	David Blackwell†	2018	1	0	1	0	0.00	–	–	–	–
22	Mike Houston	2019–2024	58	24	34	0	.414	1	1	0	–
23	Blake Harrell	2024–Present	19	14	5	0	.737	2	2	0	-
