= Shonk =

Shonk is a surname. Notable people with the surname include:

- Gabrielle Shonk, Canadian singer-songwriter
- George Washington Shonk (1850–1900), American politician
- Herbert B. Shonk (1881–1930), American lawyer, businessman, and politician
- John Shonk (1918–1984), American football player
