= 1940 Dayton Flyers football team =

American college football season

1940 Dayton Flyers football
- Conference: Independent
- Record: 6–3
- Head coach: Harry Baujan (18th season)
- Home stadium: University of Dayton Stadium

1940 Midwestern college football independents records
	Conf.			Overall
Team	W	L	T	W		L		T
Michigan Tech		–		5	–	1	–	0
Detroit		–		7	–	2	–	0
Notre Dame		–		7	–	2	–	0
Xavier		–		7	–	3	–	0
Ohio		–		5	–	2	–	2
Wayne		–		4	–	1	–	3
Dayton		–		6	–	3	–	0
Cincinnati		–		5	–	3	–	1
Wichita		–		6	–	4	–	0
Central Michigan		–		4	–	3	–	1
Marquette		–		4	–	4	–	0
Michigan State		–		3	–	4	–	1
Ohio Wesleyan		–		2	–	4	–	3
Akron		–		2	–	5	–	2
Western State Teachers		–		2	–	5	–	0
Michigan State Normal		–		1	–	5	–	1
Miami (OH)		–		0	–	7	–	1

The 1940 Dayton Flyers football team was an American football team that represented the University of Dayton as an independent during the 1940 college football season. In their 18th season under head coach Harry Baujan, the Flyers compiled a 6–3 record. The team played its home games at University of Dayton Stadium.

Center Duncan Obee was selected as a first-team player on the United Press All-Ohio team. Tackle Johnny Humm received first-team honors on the Associated Press All-Ohio team.

== Schedule ==
Date	Time	Opponent	Site	Result	Attendance	Source
September 27		Wichita^{†}	University of Dayton Stadium; Dayton, OH	L 0–9	7,500	
October 5		at Marshall	Fairfield Stadium; Huntington, WV	L 12–25		
October 12	3:00 p.m.	Western Reserve	University of Dayton Stadium; Dayton OH	W 20–12	4,300	
October 19		at Miami (OH)	Miami Field; Oxford, OH	W 28–6		
October 26		at Cincinnati	Nippert Stadium; Cincinnati, OH	W 7–0	12,500	
November 2	2:15 p.m.	Transylvania	University of Dayton Stadium; Dayton OH	W 26–0	3,000	
November 9		Xavier^{†}	University of Dayton Stadium; Dayton OH	W 13–0	7,500	
November 16		Ohio	University of Dayton Stadium; Dayton, OH	L 0–7	3,500	
November 21		Ohio Wesleyan	University of Dayton Stadium; Dayton, OH	W 27–0		
^{†}Homecoming; All times are in Eastern time
