= 1940 Detroit Titans football team =

American college football season

1940 Detroit Titans football
- Conference: Independent
- Record: 7–2
- Head coach: Gus Dorais (16th season)
- Captain: Casimere Brovarney
- Home stadium: University of Detroit Stadium

1940 Midwestern college football independents records
	Conf.			Overall
Team	W	L	T	W		L		T
Michigan Tech		–		5	–	1	–	0
Detroit		–		7	–	2	–	0
Notre Dame		–		7	–	2	–	0
Xavier		–		7	–	3	–	0
Ohio		–		5	–	2	–	2
Wayne		–		4	–	1	–	3
Dayton		–		6	–	3	–	0
Cincinnati		–		5	–	3	–	1
Wichita		–		6	–	4	–	0
Central Michigan		–		4	–	3	–	1
Marquette		–		4	–	4	–	0
Michigan State		–		3	–	4	–	1
Ohio Wesleyan		–		2	–	4	–	3
Akron		–		2	–	5	–	2
Western State Teachers		–		2	–	5	–	0
Michigan State Normal		–		1	–	5	–	1
Miami (OH)		–		0	–	7	–	1

The 1940 Detroit Titans football team represented the University of Detroit in the 1940 college football season. Detroit shut out six of nine opponents, outscored all opponents by a combined total of 147 to 27, and finished with a 7–2 record in its 16th year under head coach and College Football Hall of Fame inductee, Gus Dorais. During the 1940 season, Dorais registered his 100th victory as coach of the Titans. In his first 16 seasons with the University of Detroit, Dorais compiled a 101–42–7 record.

According to the American Football Statistical Bureau's 1940 yearbook, the Titans ranked first among the 13 major Midwestern schools (a category including the Western Conference teams) in total offense (322.3 yards per game), rushing offense (242.6 yards per game), total defense (140 yards per game), rushing defense (63.6 yards per game), first downs made (133), and fewest first downs against (58).

Detroit was ranked at No. 38 (out of 697 college football teams) in the final rankings under the Litkenhous Difference by Score system for 1940.

Detroit halfback Al Ghesquiere led the NCAA major college programs with 956 rushing yards, finishing ahead of Michigan's Heisman Trophy winner, Tom Harmon. The team's center, Vince Banonis, was later inducted into the College Football Hall of Fame. The team's captain was Casimere Brovarney. The assistant coaches were line coach Bud Boeringer and backfield coach Lloyd Brazil.

== Schedule ==
Date	Opponent	Rank	Site	Result	Attendance	Source
September 27	Wayne		University of Detroit Stadium; Detroit, MI	W 42–7	21,200	
October 4	Catholic University		University of Detroit Stadium; Detroit, MI	W 13–0	19,353	
October 11	Michigan State Normal		University of Detroit Stadium; Detroit, MI	W 47–0	16,341	
October 18	at Manhattan		Polo Grounds; New York, NY	W 6–0	11,500	
October 27	at Villanova		Shibe Park; Philadelphia, PA	W 10–0	30,251	
November 2	Tulsa	No. 17	University of Detroit Stadium; Detroit, MI	L 0–7	19,861	
November 9	TCU		University of Detroit Stadium; Detroit, MI	W 3–0	12,352	
November 16	at Gonzaga		Gonzaga Stadium; Spokane, WA	L 7–13	6,000	
November 23	Marquette		University of Detroit Stadium; Detroit, MI	W 19–0	10,000	
Rankings from AP Poll released prior to the game

== Rankings ==
Ranking movements Legend: ██ Increase in ranking ██ Decrease in ranking — = Not ranked
	Week							
Poll	1	2	3	4	5	6	7	Final
AP	—	—	17	—	—	—	—	—

== Players ==
- Vince Banonis, center
- John Biringer, quarterback
- Casimere Brovarney, guard
- Ray Domerque, guard
- James Ellis, halfback
- Al Ghesquiere, left halfback
- Al Goodrich, fullback
- Harry Groth, fullback
- William Harrison, end
- Frank Hayes, end
- Don Hughes, quarterback
- Clyde Johnson, fullback
- Howard Keating, end
- Robert Keene, right halfback
- Ed Kukorowski, tackle
- Tom Martin, halfback
- Paul McErlean, halfback
- Paul McLaughlin, halfback
- Tom McLoughlin, guard
- John McManigal, guard
- Don Parro, center
- Ted Pavelec, tackle
- Jack Pearl, fullback
- George Petersmarck, tackle
- Richard Pugh, guard
- Ed Rice, tackle
- Meyrl Toepfer, end
