= Bill Stobbs =

American football player (1896–1968)

- Stobbs in 1931

Profile
- Position: Blocking back

Personal information
- Born: May 28, 1896; Wheeling, West Virginia, U.S.
- Died: November 15, 1968 (aged 72); Richmond, Virginia, U.S.
- Listed height: 5 ft 7 in (1.70 m)

Career information
- College: Washington & Jefferson

Career history

Playing
- Detroit Tigers (1921)

Coaching
- Football: Linsly Military Institute (WV) (1919) Head coach; South Carolina (1920) Assistant coach; Wheeling HS (WV) (1922–1924) Head coach; Linsly Military Institute (WV) (1925–1928) Head coach; Wittenberg (1929–1941) Head coach; Basketball: Wheeling HS (WV) (1922–1925) Head coach; Wittenberg (1932–1942) Head coach; Baseball: Linsly Military Institute (1920) Head coach

Career statistics
- Games played: 7
- Games started: 7
- Stats at Pro Football Reference

Thomas William Stobbs Jr. (May 28, 1896 – November 14, 1968) was an American professional football player and coach. In 1921, he played professionally for the Detroit Tigers of the American Professional Football Association (APFA), which was renamed as the National Football League (NFL) in 1922. Stobbs attended high school at Wheeling High School and the Linsly Military Institute—now known as the Linsly School—both in Wheeling, West Virginia, and played college football at Washington & Jefferson College in Washington, Pennsylvania. Stobbs served as the head football coach at Wittenberg College—now known as Wittenberg University—in Springfield, Ohio from 1929 to 1941. He was also the head basketball coach at Wittenberg from 1931 to 1942.

Stobbs coached football at in 1919 and baseball the following spring at Linsly. He went to the University of South Carolina in 1920 to serve as an assistant football coach under Sol Metzger. In 1922, Stobb was hired as coach and director physical education at Wheeling High School. He left Wheeling High in 1925 to return to Linsly as coach. In 1931, Stobbs applied to be the head football coach at his alma mater, Washington & Jefferson.

His son, Chuck Stobbs, played professional baseball.

== Head coaching record ==
=== College football ===
Year	Team	Overall	Conference	Standing	Bowl/playoffs
Wittenberg Tigers (Buckeye Athletic Association) (1929)
1929	Wittenberg	5–4–1	2–2–1	4th	
Wittenberg Tigers (Independent) (1930)
1930	Wittenberg	3–3–3			
Wittenberg Tigers (Buckeye Athletic Association) (1930–1933)
1931	Wittenberg	8–0–1	1–0	2nd	
1932	Wittenberg	3–6	1–4	5th	
1933	Wittenberg	2–6	0–5	6th	
Wittenberg Tigers (Ohio Athletic Conference) (1934–1941)
1934	Wittenberg	2–7	1–5	21st	
1935	Wittenberg	4–5	3–3	T–6th	
1936	Wittenberg	4–5	3–2	9th	
1937	Wittenberg	2–7	2–5	T–14th	
1938	Wittenberg	4–4	4–2	T–8th	
1939	Wittenberg	5–3	4–2	T–8th	
1940	Wittenberg	8–0	7–0	1st	
1941	Wittenberg	4–4	3–4	9th	
Wittenberg:		54–54–5	32–34–1		
Total:		54–54–5			
National championship Conference title Conference division title or championship game berth
