= 1940 South Dakota Coyotes football team =

American college football season

1940 South Dakota Coyotes football
- Conference: North Central Conference
- Record: 4–5–1 (2–1–1 NCC)
- Head coach: Harry Gamage (7th season)
- Home stadium: Inman Field

1940 North Central Conference football standings
	Conf.					Overall
Team	W		L		T	W		L		T
Iowa State Teachers $	5	–	0	–	0	8	–	1	–	0
North Dakota	3	–	1	–	0	5	–	4	–	0
South Dakota	2	–	1	–	1	4	–	5	–	0
Morningside	2	–	2	–	1	3	–	2	–	2
South Dakota State	2	–	3	–	1	4	–	3	–	1
Omaha	1	–	3	–	1	2	–	3	–	2
North Dakota Agricultural	0	–	5	–	0	1	–	8	–	0
$ – Conference champion

The 1940 South Dakota Coyotes football team was an American football team that represented the University of South Dakota in the North Central Conference (NCC) during the 1940 college football season. In its seventh season under head coach Harry Gamage, the team compiled a 4–5–1 record (2–1–1 against NCC opponents), finished in third place out of seven teams in the NCC, and was outscored by a total of 162 to 109.

South Dakota was ranked at No. 280 (out of 697 college football teams) in the final rankings under the Litkenhous Difference by Score system for 1940.

The team played its home games at Inman Field in Vermillion, South Dakota.

== Schedule ==
Date	Opponent	Site	Result	Source
September 21	Dakota Wesleyan*	Inman Field; Vermillion, SD	W 19–6	
September 28	Wayne Teachers (NE)*	Inman Field; Vermillion, SD	L 0–6	
October 5	at Iowa*	Iowa Stadium; Iowa City, IA	L 0–46	
October 12	Doane*	Inman Field; Vermillion, SD	W 25–0	
October 19	Morningside	Inman Field; Vermillion, SD	W 26–6	
October 26	at South Dakota State	Brookings, SD (rivalry)	W 26–0	
November 2	at Omaha	Omaha, NE	T 6–6	
November 9	North Dakota	Inman Field; Vermillion, SD (rivalry)	L 0–13	
November 16	at Creighton*	Creighton Stadium; Omaha, NE	L 0–39	
November 21	at San Jose State*	Spartan Stadium; San Jose, CA	L 7–40	
*Non-conference game
