= 1940 Drake Bulldogs football team =

American college football season

1940 Drake Bulldogs football
- Conference: Missouri Valley Conference
- Record: 4–5 (2–2 MVC)
- Head coach: Vee Green (8th season)
- Home stadium: Drake Stadium

1940 Missouri Valley Conference football standings
	Conf.					Overall
Team	W		L		T	W		L		T
Tulsa $	4	–	0	–	0	7	–	3	–	0
Oklahoma A&M	4	–	1	–	0	6	–	3	–	1
Creighton	2	–	2	–	0	6	–	2	–	2
Drake	2	–	2	–	0	4	–	5	–	0
Saint Louis	2	–	3	–	0	3	–	6	–	0
Washington University	1	–	3	–	0	3	–	6	–	0
Washburn	0	–	4	–	0	4	–	6	–	0
$ – Conference champion

The 1940 Drake Bulldogs football team represented Drake University in the Missouri Valley Conference (MVC) during the 1940 college football season. In its eighth season under head coach Vee Green, the team compiled a 4–5 record (2–2 against MVC opponents), tied for third place in the MVC, and outscored opponents by a total of 125 to 108.

Drake was ranked at No. 151 (out of 697 college football teams) in the final rankings under the Litkenhous Difference by Score system for 1940.

== Schedule ==
Date	Time	Opponent	Site	Result	Attendance	Source
September 27		Montana State*	Drake Stadium; Moines, IA	W 56–0	8,000	
October 5		Grinnell*	Drake Stadium; Des Moines, IA	W 20–7		
October 12		at Kansas*	Memorial Stadium; Lawrence, KS	L 6–20	8,000	
October 19		at Navy*	Thompson Stadium; Annapolis, MD	L 0–19		
October 26		Saint Louis	Drake Stadium; Des Moines, IA	L 0–21		
November 2		at Washburn	Moore Bowl; Topeka, KS	W 19–6		
November 9		at Iowa State*	Clyde Williams Field; Ames, IA	L 6–7	5,444	
November 16	2:00 p.m.	at Washington University	Francis Field; St. Louis, MO	W 20–14	4,000	
November 23		Creighton	Drake Stadium; Des Moines, IA	L 0–14	6,000	
*Non-conference game; All times are in Central time
