= 1940 Wichita Shockers football team =

American college football season

1940 Wichita Shockers football
- Conference: Independent
- Record: 6–4
- Head coach: Al Gebert (11th season)

1940 Midwestern college football independents records
	Conf.			Overall
Team	W	L	T	W		L		T
Michigan Tech		–		5	–	1	–	0
Detroit		–		7	–	2	–	0
Notre Dame		–		7	–	2	–	0
Xavier		–		7	–	3	–	0
Ohio		–		5	–	2	–	2
Wayne		–		4	–	1	–	3
Dayton		–		6	–	3	–	0
Cincinnati		–		5	–	3	–	1
Wichita		–		6	–	4	–	0
Central Michigan		–		4	–	3	–	1
Marquette		–		4	–	4	–	0
Michigan State		–		3	–	4	–	1
Ohio Wesleyan		–		2	–	4	–	3
Akron		–		2	–	5	–	2
Western State Teachers		–		2	–	5	–	0
Michigan State Normal		–		1	–	5	–	1
Miami (OH)		–		0	–	7	–	1

The 1940 Wichita Shockers football team was an American football team that represented Wichita University (now known as Wichita State University) as an independent during the 1940 college football season. In their 11th season under head coach Al Gebert, the Shockers compiled a 6–4 record and outscored opponents by a total of 102 to 72.

Wichita was ranked at No. 159 (out of 697 college football teams) in the final rankings under the Litkenhous Difference by Score system for 1940.

== Schedule ==
Date	Opponent	Site	Result	Attendance	Source
September 27	at Dayton	University of Dayton Stadium; Dayton, OH	W 9–0	7,500	
October 5	St. Benedict's	Wichita, KS	W 33–0		
October 12	at Oklahoma A&M	Lewis Field; Stillwater, OK	L 6–26	4,500	
October 19	Pittsburg State	Wichita, KS	W 12–6		
October 25	at Washburn	Topeka, KS	W 14–6		
November 1	at Saint Louis	Walsh Stadium; St. Louis, MO	L 0–13	6,358	
November 9	Emporia State	Wichita, KS	L 7–14		
November 16	Wyoming	Wichita, KS	W 2–0	4,500	
November 22	North Dakota Agricultural	Wichita, KS	W 19–0		
November 28	Creighton	Wichita, KS	L 0–7		
