= 1940 North Dakota Fighting Sioux football team =

American college football season

1940 North Dakota Fighting Sioux football
- Conference: North Central Conference
- Record: 5–4 (4–1 NCC)
- Head coach: Charles A. West (12th season)

1940 North Central Conference football standings
	Conf.					Overall
Team	W		L		T	W		L		T
Iowa State Teachers $	5	–	0	–	0	8	–	1	–	0
North Dakota	3	–	1	–	0	5	–	4	–	0
South Dakota	2	–	1	–	1	4	–	5	–	0
Morningside	2	–	2	–	1	3	–	2	–	2
South Dakota State	2	–	3	–	1	4	–	3	–	1
Omaha	1	–	3	–	1	2	–	3	–	2
North Dakota Agricultural	0	–	5	–	0	1	–	8	–	0
$ – Conference champion

The 1940 North Dakota Fighting Sioux football team, also known as the Nodaks, was an American football team that represented the University of North Dakota in the North Central Conference (NCC) during the 1940 college football season. In its 12th year under head coach Charles A. West, the team compiled a 5–4 record (4–1 against NCC opponents), finished in second place out of seven teams in the NCC, and was outscored by a total of 110 to 102.

North Dakota was ranked at No. 196 (out of 697 college football teams) in the final rankings under the Litkenhous Difference by Score system for 1940.

== Schedule ==
Date	Opponent	Site	Result	Source
September 20	St. Thomas (MN)*	Memorial Stadium; Grand Forks, ND	W 20–6	
September 28	at Texas Mines*	Kidd Field; El Paso, TX	L 6–20	
October 4	Iowa State Teachers	Memorial Stadium; Grand Forks, ND	W 0–15	
October 12	St. Mary's (TX)*	Memorial Stadium; Grand Forks, ND	W 15–7	
October 18	South Dakota State*	Memorial Stadium; Grand Forks, ND	W 6–0	
October 26	at North Dakota Agricultural	Dacotah Field; Fargo, ND (Nickel Trophy)	W 24–0	
November 9	South Dakota	Memorial Stadium; Grand Forks, ND (rivalry)	W 13–0	
November 16	Bradley*	Memorial Stadium; Grand Forks, ND	W 6–32	
November 23	at Arizona State*	Goodwin Stadium; Tempe, AZ	L 12–30	
*Non-conference game
