= 1940 Akron Zippers football team =

American college football season

1940 Akron Zippers football
- Conference: Independent
- Record: 2–5–2
- Head coach: Thomas Dowler (2nd season)
- Captain: Mike Fernella
- Home stadium: Buchtel Field, Rubber Bowl

1940 Midwestern college football independents records
	Conf.			Overall
Team	W	L	T	W		L		T
Michigan Tech		–		5	–	1	–	0
Detroit		–		7	–	2	–	0
Notre Dame		–		7	–	2	–	0
Xavier		–		7	–	3	–	0
Ohio		–		5	–	2	–	2
Wayne		–		4	–	1	–	3
Dayton		–		6	–	3	–	0
Cincinnati		–		5	–	3	–	1
Wichita		–		6	–	4	–	0
Central Michigan		–		4	–	3	–	1
Marquette		–		4	–	4	–	0
Michigan State		–		3	–	4	–	1
Ohio Wesleyan		–		2	–	4	–	3
Akron		–		2	–	5	–	2
Western State Teachers		–		2	–	5	–	0
Michigan State Normal		–		1	–	5	–	1
Miami (OH)		–		0	–	7	–	1

The 1940 Akron Zippers football team was an American football team that represented the University of Akron as an independent during the 1940 college football season. In its second and final season under head coach Thomas Dowler, the team compiled a 2–5–2 record and was outscored by a total of 106 to 90. Mike Fernella was the team captain.

Akron was ranked at No. 203 (out of 697 college football teams) in the final rankings under the Litkenhous Difference by Score system for 1940.

== Schedule ==
Date	Time	Opponent	Site	Result	Attendance	Source
September 21		Detroit Tech	Buchtel Field; Akron, OH	T 0–0		
September 28		at Colgate	Colgate Athletic Field; Hamilton, NY	L 0–44	6,000	
October 4	8:15 p.m.	Western Reserve	Rubber Bowl; Akron, OH	L 0–6	20,000	
October 12		Illinois Wesleyan	Rubber Bowl; Akron, OH	L 6–16		
October 19		at Wayne	Keyworth Stadium; Hamtramck, MI	T 7–7		
October 25		Baldwin–Wallace	Rubber Bowl; Akron, OH	L 7–13		
November 2		Youngstown	Rubber Bowl; Akron, OH (Steel Tire)	L 0–13		
November 9		Kent State	Rubber Bowl; Akron, OH (rivalry)	W 23–7		
November 21		John Carroll	Buchtel Field; Akron, OH	W 47–0		
All times are in Eastern time
