= 1940 North Dakota Agricultural Bison football team =

American college football season

1940 North Dakota Agricultural Bison football
- Conference: North Central Conference
- Record: 1–8 (0–5 NCC)
- Head coach: Casey Finnegan (12th season)
- Captain: Don Johnston
- Home stadium: Dacotah Field

1940 North Central Conference football standings
	Conf.					Overall
Team	W		L		T	W		L		T
Iowa State Teachers $	5	–	0	–	0	8	–	1	–	0
North Dakota	3	–	1	–	0	5	–	4	–	0
South Dakota	2	–	1	–	1	4	–	5	–	0
Morningside	2	–	2	–	1	3	–	2	–	2
South Dakota State	2	–	3	–	1	4	–	3	–	1
Omaha	1	–	3	–	1	2	–	3	–	2
North Dakota Agricultural	0	–	5	–	0	1	–	8	–	0
$ – Conference champion

The 1940 North Dakota Agricultural Bison football team was an American football team that represented North Dakota Agricultural College (now known as North Dakota State University) in the North Central Conference (NCC) during the 1940 college football season. In its 12th season under head coach Casey Finnegan, the team compiled a 1–8 record (0–5 against NCC opponents) and finished in seventh place out of seven teams in the NCC.

North Dakota Agricultural was ranked at No. 396 (out of 697 college football teams) in the final rankings under the Litkenhous Difference by Score system for 1940.

The team played its home games at Dacotah Field in Fargo, North Dakota.

== Schedule ==
Date	Opponent	Site	Result	Attendance	Source
September 20	Moorhead State*	Dacotah Field; Fargo, ND	W 13–6		
September 28	Carleton*	Dacotah Field; Fargo, ND	L 7–13		
October 5	at Montana State*	Gatton Field; Bozeman, MT	L 0–7	2,500	
October 11	Iowa State Teachers	Dacotah Field; Fargo, ND	L 7–13		
October 19	at Omaha	Saratoga Field; Omaha, NE	L 7–14	3,000	
October 26	North Dakota	Dacotah Field; Fargo, ND (Nickel Trophy)	L 0–24		
November 1	at South Dakota State	State Field; Brookings, SD (rivalry)	L 0–7		
November 9	at Morningside	Sioux City, IA	L 13–21		
November 22	at Wichita*	Shocker Stadium; Wichita, KS	L 0–19		
*Non-conference game
