= 1940 Saint Louis Billikens football team =

American college football season

1940 Saint Louis Billikens football
- Conference: Missouri Valley Conference
- Record: 3–6–1 (2–3 MVC)
- Head coach: Dukes Duford (1st season)
- Home stadium: Walsh Stadium

1940 Missouri Valley Conference football standings
	Conf.					Overall
Team	W		L		T	W		L		T
Tulsa $	4	–	0	–	0	7	–	3	–	0
Oklahoma A&M	4	–	1	–	0	6	–	3	–	1
Creighton	2	–	2	–	0	6	–	2	–	2
Drake	2	–	2	–	0	4	–	5	–	0
Saint Louis	2	–	3	–	0	3	–	6	–	0
Washington University	1	–	3	–	0	3	–	6	–	0
Washburn	0	–	4	–	0	4	–	6	–	0
$ – Conference champion

The 1940 Saint Louis Billikens football team was an American football team that represented Saint Louis University as a member of the Missouri Valley Conference during the 1940 college football season. In its first season under head coach Dukes Duford, the team compiled an overall record of 3–6–1 record with a mark of 2–3 in conference play, placing fifth in the MVC, and was outscored by a total of 113 to 88.

Saint Louis was ranked at No. 117 (out of 697 college football teams) in the final rankings under the Litkenhous Difference by Score system for 1940.

The team played home games at Walsh Stadium in St. Louis.

== Schedule ==
Date	Time	Opponent	Site	Result	Attendance	Source
September 28		at Missouri*	Memorial Stadium; Columbia, MO	L 26–40		
October 4		Missouri Mines*	Walsh Stadium; St. Louis, MO	T 0–0	5,604	
October 12	7:30 p.m.	at Centenary*	Centenary College Stadium; Shreveport, LA	L 6–19	5,000	
October 18		Tulsa	Walsh Stadium; St. Louis, MO	L 6–19	5,545	
October 26		at Drake	Drake Stadium; Des Moines, IA	W 21–0		
November 1		Wichita*	Walsh Stadium; St. Louis, MO	W 13–0	6,358	
November 8		Creighton	Walsh Stadium; St. Louis, MO	L 0–14	7,373	
November 16		at Oklahoma A&M	Lewis Field; Stillwater, OK	L 7–14		
November 21		No. 20 Texas Tech*	Walsh Stadium; St. Louis, MO	L 6–7		
November 30	2:00 p.m.	Washington University	Walsh Stadium; St. Louis, MO	W 3–0	11,050	
*Non-conference game; Rankings from AP Poll released prior to the game; All times are in Central time
