= 1940 Georgia Teachers Blue Tide football team =

American college football season

1940 Georgia Teachers Blue Tide football
- Conference: Independent
- Record: 3–5
- Head coach: Crook Smith (12th season)

1940 Southern college football independents records
	Conf.			Overall
Team	W	L	T	W		L		T
No. 17 Hardin–Simmons		–		9	–	0	–	0
No. 13 Georgetown		–		8	–	2	–	0
Navy		–		6	–	2	–	1
Delaware		–		5	–	3	–	0
East Carolina		–		5	–	3	–	0
Western Maryland		–		5	–	3	–	0
George Washington		–		5	–	3	–	1
Catholic University		–		4	–	3	–	1
West Virginia		–		4	–	4	–	1
Virginia		–		4	–	5	–	0
Georgia Teachers		–		3	–	5	–	0
Roanoke		–		2	–	6	–	0
Oklahoma City		–		1	–	7	–	3
William & Mary Norfolk		–		0	–	6	–	0
Rankings from AP Poll

The 1940 Georgia Teachers Blue Tide football team represented the Georgia Teachers College—now known as Georgia Southern University—during the 1940 college football season. The team was led by Crook Smith in his 12th year as head coach.

South Georgia was ranked at No. 638 (out of 697 college football teams) in the final rankings under the Litkenhous Difference by Score system for 1940.

== Schedule ==
Date	Time	Opponent	Site	Result	Attendance	Source
September 20	3:00 p.m.	at Erskine	Due West, SC	L 0–22		
October 5	3:00 p.m.	South Georgia	Statesboro, GA	L 7–19		
October 12	2:00 p.m.	at Fort Benning	Doughboy Stadium; Columbus, GA	W 17–13		
October 19		Troy State	Statesboro, GA	L 0–14		
October 26	8:00 p.m.	at Tampa	Phillips Field; Tampa, FL	L 14–64	2,500	
November 9		Middle Georgia	Statesboro, GA	W 14–6		
November 16	3:00 p.m.	at Pensacola NAS	Station field; Pensacola, FL	L 6–38		
November 21	3:00 p.m.	Armstrong^{†}	Statesboro, GA	W 43–0		
^{†}Homecoming; All times are in Eastern time
