= Frank Loebs =

American football player and coach (1913–1977)

Biographical details
- Born: January 10, 1913; Cleveland, Ohio, U.S.
- Died: June 13, 1977 (aged 64); Cleveland, Ohio, U.S.

Playing career
- 1932–1935: Purdue
- Position: End

Coaching career (HC unless noted)
- 1940–1941: Washington University

Head coaching record
- Overall: 7–11

Accomplishments and honors

Awards
- All–Big Ten (1935)

Frank John "Butch" Loebs (January 10, 1913 – June 13, 1977) was an American college football player and coach. He served as the head football coach at Washington University in St. Louis from 1940 to 1941, compiling a record of 7–11. Loebs played college football at Purdue University as an end. He was a third-round pick for the New York Giants in the 1936 NFL draft but he never played in the NFL. Prior to becoming head coach at Washington University, he served for three seasons as an assistant coach there.

During World War II, he served in the United States Navy, reaching the rank of lieutenant commander.

== Head coaching record ==
Year	Team	Overall	Conference	Standing	Bowl/playoffs
Washington University Bears (Missouri Valley Conference) (1940–1941)
1940	Washington University	3–6	1–3	6th	
1941	Washington University	4–5	1–3	5th	
Washington University:		7–11	2–3		
Total:		7–11			
