= 1940 Ohio Bobcats football team =

American college football season

1940 Ohio Bobcats football
- Conference: Independent
- Record: 5–2–2
- Head coach: Don Peden (17th season)
- Home stadium: Ohio Stadium

1940 Midwestern college football independents records
	Conf.			Overall
Team	W	L	T	W		L		T
Michigan Tech		–		5	–	1	–	0
Detroit		–		7	–	2	–	0
Notre Dame		–		7	–	2	–	0
Xavier		–		7	–	3	–	0
Ohio		–		5	–	2	–	2
Wayne		–		4	–	1	–	3
Dayton		–		6	–	3	–	0
Cincinnati		–		5	–	3	–	1
Wichita		–		6	–	4	–	0
Central Michigan		–		4	–	3	–	1
Marquette		–		4	–	4	–	0
Michigan State		–		3	–	4	–	1
Ohio Wesleyan		–		2	–	4	–	3
Akron		–		2	–	5	–	2
Western State Teachers		–		2	–	5	–	0
Michigan State Normal		–		1	–	5	–	1
Miami (OH)		–		0	–	7	–	1

The 1940 Ohio Bobcats football team was an American football team that represented Ohio University as an independent during the 1940 college football season. In their 17th season under head coach Don Peden, the Bobcats compiled a 5–2–2 record and outscored opponents by a total of 89 to 32.

Ohio was ranked at No. 106 (out of 697 college football teams) in the final rankings under the Litkenhous Difference by Score system for 1940.

== Schedule ==
Date	Time	Opponent	Site	Result	Attendance	Source
September 28		Youngstown	Ohio Stadium; Athens, OH	W 13–0	9,000	
October 5		Butler	Ohio Stadium; Athens, OH	T 7–7		
October 12		Western State Teachers (MI)	Ohio Stadium; Athens, OH	W 20–7		
October 19		Furman^{†}	Ohio Stadium; Athens, OH	W 15–6	9,000	
October 26		at Ohio Wesleyan	Delaware, OH	T 0–0	7,000	
November 2		at Miami (OH)	Miami Field; Oxford, OH (rivalry)	W 27–0	6,000	
November 9	2:00 p.m.	at Western Reserve	League Park; Cleveland, OH	L 0–6	7,500–9,000	
November 16		at Dayton	Dayton, OH	W 7–0	3,500	
November 21		at Xavier	Xavier Stadium; Cincinnati, OH	L 0–6	8,000	
^{†}Homecoming; All times are in Eastern time
