= 1940 Iowa State Teachers Panthers football team =

American college football season

1940 Iowa State Teachers Panthers football

NCC champion
- Conference: North Central Conference
- Record: 8–1 (5–0 NCC)
- Head coach: Clyde Starbeck (5th season)
- Home stadium: O. R. Latham Stadium

1940 North Central Conference football standings
	Conf.					Overall
Team	W		L		T	W		L		T
Iowa State Teachers $	5	–	0	–	0	8	–	1	–	0
North Dakota	3	–	1	–	0	5	–	4	–	0
South Dakota	2	–	1	–	1	4	–	5	–	0
Morningside	2	–	2	–	1	3	–	2	–	2
South Dakota State	2	–	3	–	1	4	–	3	–	1
Omaha	1	–	3	–	1	2	–	3	–	2
North Dakota Agricultural	0	–	5	–	0	1	–	8	–	0
$ – Conference champion

The 1940 Iowa State Teachers Panthers football team represented Iowa State Teachers College in the North Central Conference during the 1940 college football season. In its fifth season under head coach Clyde Starbeck, the team compiled an 8–1 record (5–0 against NCC opponents) and won the conference championship. After losing its season opener against Creighton, the team won its final eight games.

Iowa State Teachers was ranked at No. 182 (out of 697 college football teams) in the final rankings under the Litkenhous Difference by Score system for 1940.

== Schedule ==
Date	Opponent	Site	Result	Attendance	Source
September 28	Creighton*	Creighton Stadium; Omaha, NE	L 0–20		
October 4	at North Dakota	Memorial Stadium; Grand Forks, ND	W 15–0		
October 11	at North Dakota Agricultural	Dacotah Field; Fargo, ND	W 13–7		
October 19	at Western State Teachers*	Waldo Stadium; Kalamazoo, MI	W 20–19		
October 26	Pittsburg State*	O. R. Latham Stadium; Cedar Falls, IA	W 13–6	5,000	
November 2	Morningside	O. R. Latham Stadium; Cedar Falls, IA	W 13–0		
November 9	South Dakota State	O. R. Latham Stadium; Cedar Falls, IA	W 12–2		
November 16	at Omaha	Omaha, NE	W 27–7		
November 23	Simpson (IA)*	O. R. Latham Stadium; Cedar Falls, IA	W 52–7		
*Non-conference game
