= 1940 Marquette Hilltoppers football team =

American college football season

1940 Marquette Hilltoppers football
- Conference: Independent
- Record: 4–4
- Head coach: Paddy Driscoll (4th season)
- Home stadium: Marquette Stadium

1940 Midwestern college football independents records
	Conf.			Overall
Team	W	L	T	W		L		T
Michigan Tech		–		5	–	1	–	0
Detroit		–		7	–	2	–	0
Notre Dame		–		7	–	2	–	0
Xavier		–		7	–	3	–	0
Ohio		–		5	–	2	–	2
Wayne		–		4	–	1	–	3
Dayton		–		6	–	3	–	0
Cincinnati		–		5	–	3	–	1
Wichita		–		6	–	4	–	0
Central Michigan		–		4	–	3	–	1
Marquette		–		4	–	4	–	0
Michigan State		–		3	–	4	–	1
Ohio Wesleyan		–		2	–	4	–	3
Akron		–		2	–	5	–	2
Western State Teachers		–		2	–	5	–	0
Michigan State Normal		–		1	–	5	–	1
Miami (OH)		–		0	–	7	–	1

The 1940 Marquette Hilltoppers football team was an American football team that represented Marquette University as an independent during the 1940 college football season. In its fourth and final season under head coach Paddy Driscoll, the team compiled a 4–4 record and outscored opponents by a total of 99 to 95.

Marquette was ranked at No. 82 (out of 697 college football teams) in the final rankings under the Litkenhous Difference by Score system for 1940.

The team played its home games at Marquette Stadium in Milwaukee.

On November 23, 1940, with two games remaining on the schedule, Marquette announced that Paddy Driscoll's resignation as coach had been received and accepted. In announcing the resignation, the university stated: "This action was taken for personal reasons, independent of any winning or losing record." Driscoll compiled a 10–23–1 in four years as Marquette's coach.

== Schedule ==
Date	Opponent	Site	Result	Attendance	Source
October 5	at Wisconsin	Camp Randall Stadium; Madison, WI	L 19–33	35,000	
October 11	Iowa State	Marquette Stadium; Milwaukee, WI	W 41–25	15,000	
October 19	at Creighton^{†}	Creighton Stadium; Omaha, NE	T 27–27		
October 26	Texas Tech	Marquette Stadium; Milwaukee, WI	L 13–20	8,000	
November 2	at Duquesne	Forbes Field; Pittsburgh, PA	L 0–14	14,218	
November 9	at Manhattan	Yankee Stadium; Bronx, NY	L 41–45	6,000	
November 16	Michigan State^{†}	Marquette Stadium; Milwaukee, WI	W 7–6	10,000	
November 23	at Detroit	University of Detroit Stadium; Detroit, MI	L 0–19	10,000	
November 30	at Arizona	Varsity Stadium; Tucson, AZ	L 14–17	9,000	
^{†}Homecoming
