= 1940 Delaware Fightin' Blue Hens football team =

American college football season

1940 Delaware Fightin' Blue Hens football
- Conference: Independent
- Record: 5–3
- Head coach: William D. Murray (2nd season)
- Home stadium: Frazer Field, Wilmington Park

1940 Southern college football independents records
	Conf.			Overall
Team	W	L	T	W		L		T
No. 17 Hardin–Simmons		–		9	–	0	–	0
No. 13 Georgetown		–		8	–	2	–	0
Navy		–		6	–	2	–	1
Delaware		–		5	–	3	–	0
East Carolina		–		5	–	3	–	0
Western Maryland		–		5	–	3	–	0
George Washington		–		5	–	3	–	1
Catholic University		–		4	–	3	–	1
West Virginia		–		4	–	4	–	1
Virginia		–		4	–	5	–	0
Georgia Teachers		–		3	–	5	–	0
Roanoke		–		2	–	6	–	0
Oklahoma City		–		1	–	7	–	3
William & Mary Norfolk		–		0	–	6	–	0
Rankings from AP Poll

The 1940 Delaware Fightin' Blue Hens football team was an American football team that represented the University of Delaware in the 1940 college football season. In its first season under head coach William D. Murray, the team compiled a 5–3 record and outscored opponents by a total of 87 to 54. The team's victory on October 26, 1940, started a 22-game undefeated streak that was not broken until five years later on October 27, 1945.

Delaware was ranked at No. 375 (out of 697 college football teams) in the final rankings under the Litkenhous Difference by Score system for 1940.

== Schedule ==
Date	Opponent	Site	Result	Attendance	Source
October 5	at Hampden–Sydney	Hampden Sydney, VA	L 0–7		
October 12	at Dickinson	Biddle Field; Carlisle, PA	L 0–6	3,000	
October 19	Ursinus	Frazer Field; Newark, DE	L 0–25		
October 26	Drexel	Frazer Field; Newark, DE	W 19–0		
November 2	Johns Hopkins	Frazer Field; Newark, DE	W 25–0		
November 9	Pennsylvania Military	Wilmington Park; Wilmington, DE	W 14–7	3,500	
November 16	at Washington College	Chestertown, MD	W 13–9		
November 21	Lebanon Valley	Wilmington Park; Wilmington, DE	W 16–0	5,000	
