= 1940 South Dakota State Jackrabbits football team =

American college football season

1940 South Dakota State Jackrabbits football
- Conference: North Central Conference
- Record: 4–3–1 (2–3–1 NCC)
- Head coach: Jack V. Barnes (3rd season)
- Home stadium: State Field

1940 North Central Conference football standings
	Conf.					Overall
Team	W		L		T	W		L		T
Iowa State Teachers $	5	–	0	–	0	8	–	1	–	0
North Dakota	3	–	1	–	0	5	–	4	–	0
South Dakota	2	–	1	–	1	4	–	5	–	0
Morningside	2	–	2	–	1	3	–	2	–	2
South Dakota State	2	–	3	–	1	4	–	3	–	1
Omaha	1	–	3	–	1	2	–	3	–	2
North Dakota Agricultural	0	–	5	–	0	1	–	8	–	0
$ – Conference champion

The 1940 South Dakota State Jackrabbits football team was an American football team that represented South Dakota State University in the North Central Conference (NCC) during the 1940 college football season. In its third season under head coach Jack V. Barnes, the team compiled a 4–3–1 record and outscored opponents by a total of 78 to 57.

South Dakota State was ranked at No. 332 (out of 697 college football teams) in the final rankings under the Litkenhous Difference by Score system for 1940.

== Schedule ==
Date	Opponent	Site	Result	Source
September 21	South Dakota Mines	State Field; Brookings, SD	W 45–0	
September 28	St. Norbert	State Field; Brookings, SD	W 6–0	
October 5	Omaha	State Field; Brookings, SD	W 12–7	
October 12	at Morningside	Sioux City, IA	T 6–6	
October 18	at North Dakota	Memorial Stadium; Grand Forks, ND	L 0–6	
October 26	South Dakota^{†}	State Field; Brookings, SD (rivalry, Hobo Day)	L 0–26	
November 1	North Dakota Agricultural	State Field; Brookings, SD (rivalry)	W 7–0	
November 9	at Iowa State Teachers	O. R. Latham Stadium; Cedar Falls, IA	L 2–12	
^{†}Homecoming
