= 1940 East Carolina Pirates football team =

American college football season

1940 East Carolina Pirates football
- Conference: Independent
- Record: 5–3
- Head coach: John Christenbury (1st season)
- Home stadium: Guy Smith Stadium

1940 Southern college football independents records
	Conf.			Overall
Team	W	L	T	W		L		T
No. 17 Hardin–Simmons		–		9	–	0	–	0
No. 13 Georgetown		–		8	–	2	–	0
Navy		–		6	–	2	–	1
Delaware		–		5	–	3	–	0
East Carolina		–		5	–	3	–	0
Western Maryland		–		5	–	3	–	0
George Washington		–		5	–	3	–	1
Catholic University		–		4	–	3	–	1
West Virginia		–		4	–	4	–	1
Virginia		–		4	–	5	–	0
Georgia Teachers		–		3	–	5	–	0
Roanoke		–		2	–	6	–	0
Oklahoma City		–		1	–	7	–	3
William & Mary Norfolk		–		0	–	6	–	0
Rankings from AP Poll

The 1940 East Carolina Pirates football team was an American football team that represented East Carolina Teachers College (now known as East Carolina University) as an independent during the 1940 college football season. In their first season under head coach John Christenbury, the team compiled a 5–3 record.

East Carolina was ranked at No. 497 (out of 697 college football teams) in the final rankings under the Litkenhous Difference by Score system for 1940.

== Schedule ==
Date	Opponent	Site	Result	Attendance	Source
September 28	Kutztown	Guy Smith Stadium; Greenville, NC	W 14–6		
October 6	Presbyterian Junior College	Guy Smith Stadium; Greenville, NC	W 40–0		
October 12	at William & Mary Norfolk Division	Norfolk, VA	W 18–0		
October 19	at Western Carolina	Cullowhee, NC	L 14–25		
October 25	NC State freshmen	Guy Smith Stadium; Greenville, NC	L 0–26	2,000	
November 2	at Guilford	Greensboro, NC	W 13–0		
November 16	High Point	Guy Smith Stadium; Greenville, NC	L 0–6		
November 22	at The Apprentice School	Apprentice Field; Newport News, VA	W 44–7		
