= 1940 Kent State Golden Flashes football team =

American college football season

1940 Kent State Golden Flashes football
- Conference: Ohio Athletic Conference
- Record: 8–1 (4–0 OAC)
- Head coach: Donald Starn (6th season)
- Home stadium: Rockwell Field

1940 Ohio Athletic Conference football standings
	Conf.					Overall
Team	W		L		T	W		L		T
Wittenberg $	7	–	0	–	0	8	–	0	–	0
Kent State	4	–	0	–	0	8	–	1	–	0
Case	3	–	0	–	0	6	–	2	–	0
Ohio Northern	5	–	3	–	0	5	–	3	–	0
Heidelberg	5	–	3	–	0	5	–	4	–	0
Capital	3	–	2	–	1	3	–	3	–	1
Denison	3	–	2	–	1	4	–	3	–	1
Wooster	3	–	2	–	1	4	–	3	–	1
Muskingum	3	–	2	–	0	5	–	2	–	1
Toledo	1	–	1	–	0	6	–	3	–	0
Baldwin–Wallace	2	–	2	–	0	4	–	4	–	0
Bowling Green	2	–	2	–	1	3	–	4	–	1
Kenyon	1	–	2	–	1	2	–	4	–	1
Findlay	1	–	2	–	0	4	–	4	–	0
Marietta	1	–	3	–	1	1	–	5	–	1
Otterbein	1	–	4	–	0	3	–	5	–	0
Oberlin	0	–	3	–	0	4	–	3	–	0
Ashland	0	–	3	–	0	1	–	4	–	1
John Carroll	0	–	3	–	0	2	–	6	–	0
Mount Union	0	–	6	–	0	0	–	8	–	1
$ – Conference champion

The 1940 Kent State Golden Flashes football team was an American football team that represented Kent State University during the 1940 college football season. In their sixth season under head coach Donald Starn, the Golden Flashes compiled an 8–1 record and outscored all opponents by a combined total of 186 to 43. It marked their final season at Rockwell Field.

Kent State was ranked at No. 265 (out of 697 college football teams) in the final rankings under the Litkenhous Difference by Score system for 1940.

== Schedule ==
Date	Opponent	Site	Result	Source
September 21	at Bluffton*	Rockwell Field; Kent, OH	W 37–0	
September 28	Assumption (ON)*	Rockwell Field; Kent, OH	W 26–0	
October 5	Hiram*	Rockwell Field; Kent, OH	W 26–0	
October 12	Mount Union	Rockwell Field; Kent, OH	W 26–0	
October 18	at Findlay	Findlay, OH	W 13–0	
October 26	at Washington & Jefferson*	Cameron Stadium; Washington, PA	W 31–0	
November 2	at Bowling Green	Bowling Green, OH (rivalry)	W 13–0	
November 9	at Akron*	Rubber Bowl; Akron, OH (rivalry)	L 7–23	
November 16	at Baldwin–Wallace	Berea, OH	W 16–7	
*Non-conference game
