= 1940 Tulsa Golden Hurricane football team =

American college football season

1940 Tulsa Golden Hurricane football

MVC champion
- Conference: Missouri Valley Conference
- Record: 7–3 (4–0 MVC)
- Head coach: Chet Benefiel (2nd season)
- Home stadium: Skelly Field

1940 Missouri Valley Conference football standings
| | Conf. | | | | | Overall |
| Team | W | | L | | T | W | | L | | T |
|---|---|---|---|---|---|---|---|---|---|---|
| Tulsa $ | 4 | – | 0 | – | 0 | 7 | – | 3 | – | 0 |
| Oklahoma A&M | 4 | – | 1 | – | 0 | 6 | – | 3 | – | 1 |
| Creighton | 2 | – | 2 | – | 0 | 6 | – | 2 | – | 2 |
| Drake | 2 | – | 2 | – | 0 | 4 | – | 5 | – | 0 |
| Saint Louis | 2 | – | 3 | – | 0 | 3 | – | 6 | – | 0 |
| Washington University | 1 | – | 3 | – | 0 | 3 | – | 6 | – | 0 |
| Washburn | 0 | – | 4 | – | 0 | 4 | – | 6 | – | 0 |
$ – Conference champion

The 1940 Tulsa Golden Hurricane football team represented the University of Tulsa during the 1940 college football season. In their second year under head coach Chet Benefiel, the Golden Hurricane compiled a 7–3 record (4–0 against conference opponents) and won the Missouri Valley Conference championship.

Tulsa was ranked at No. 50 (out of 697 college football teams) in the final rankings under the Litkenhous Difference by Score system for 1940.

== Schedule ==
| Date | Opponent | Site | Result | Attendance | Source |
|---|---|---|---|---|---|
| September 28 | Washburn | Skelly Field; Tulsa, OK | W 37–6 | 7,000 | |
| October 5 | at Texas A&M* | Alamo Stadium; San Antonio, TX | L 6–41 | > 20,000 | |
| October 12 | Creighton | Skelly Field; Tulsa, OK | W 32–0 | 6,600 | |
| October 18 | at Saint Louis | Walsh Memorial Stadium; St. Louis, MO | W 19–6 | 5,545 | |
| October 26 | TCU*^{†} | Skelly Field; Tulsa, OK | W 7–0 | 11,000 | |
| November 2 | at No. 17 Detroit* | University of Detroit Stadium; Detroit, MI | W 7–0 | 19,861 | |
| November 9 | Catholic University* | Skelly Field; Tulsa, OK | W 12–6 | 6,000 | |
| November 16 | at Baylor* | Waco Stadium; Waco, TX | L 6–20 | 4,000 | |
| November 23 | Oklahoma A&M | Skelly Field; Tulsa, OK (rivalry) | W 19–6 | 8,500 | |
| November 28 | Arkansas* | Skelly Field; Tulsa, OK | L 21–27 | 15,000 | |
*Non-conference game; ^{†}Homecoming; Rankings from AP Poll released prior to the game

== 1941 NFL draft ==
The following Golden Hurricane players were selected in the 1941 NFL draft following the season.

| Round | Pick | Player | Position | NFL club |
|---|---|---|---|---|
| 9 | 80 | Bill Grimmett | End | Washington Redskins |
| 22 | 200 | Lee Gentry | Halfback | Washington Redskins |
