= 1940 Toledo Rockets football team =

American college football season

1940 Toledo Rockets football
- Conference: Ohio Athletic Conference
- Record: 6–3 (1–1 OAC)
- Head coach: Clarence Spears (5th season)
- Captain: Warren Densmore

1940 Ohio Athletic Conference football standings
	Conf.					Overall
Team	W		L		T	W		L		T
Wittenberg $	7	–	0	–	0	8	–	0	–	0
Kent State	4	–	0	–	0	8	–	1	–	0
Case	3	–	0	–	0	6	–	2	–	0
Ohio Northern	5	–	3	–	0	5	–	3	–	0
Heidelberg	5	–	3	–	0	5	–	4	–	0
Capital	3	–	2	–	1	3	–	3	–	1
Denison	3	–	2	–	1	4	–	3	–	1
Wooster	3	–	2	–	1	4	–	3	–	1
Muskingum	3	–	2	–	0	5	–	2	–	1
Toledo	1	–	1	–	0	6	–	3	–	0
Baldwin–Wallace	2	–	2	–	0	4	–	4	–	0
Bowling Green	2	–	2	–	1	3	–	4	–	1
Kenyon	1	–	2	–	1	2	–	4	–	1
Findlay	1	–	2	–	0	4	–	4	–	0
Marietta	1	–	3	–	1	1	–	5	–	1
Otterbein	1	–	4	–	0	3	–	5	–	0
Oberlin	0	–	3	–	0	4	–	3	–	0
Ashland	0	–	3	–	0	1	–	4	–	1
John Carroll	0	–	3	–	0	2	–	6	–	0
Mount Union	0	–	6	–	0	0	–	8	–	1
$ – Conference champion

The 1940 Toledo Rockets football team was an American football team that represented Toledo University in the Ohio Athletic Conference during the 1940 college football season. In their fifth season under head coach Clarence Spears, the Rockets compiled a 6–3 record.

Toledo was ranked at No. 162 (out of 697 college football teams) in the final rankings under the Litkenhous Difference by Score system for 1940.

== Schedule ==
Date	Opponent	Site	Result	Attendance	Source
September 28	Detroit Tech*	University Stadium; Toledo, OH	W 21–3		
October 5	Davis & Elkins*	University Stadium; Toledo, OH	W 34–12		
October 12	Marshall*	University Stadium; Toledo, OH	W 7–6	9,000	
October 19	Scranton*	University Stadium; Toledo, OH	L 0–6		
October 26	Western State Teachers (MI)*	University Stadium; Toledo, OH	W 12–0		
November 2	John Carroll	University Stadium; Toledo, OH	W 33–12		
November 8	at Baldwin-Wallace	Berea, OH	L 12–14	4,000	
November 16	at Butler*	North Side Bowl; Indianapolis, IN	W 20–6	3,000	
November 23	at Long Island*	Ebbetts Field; Brooklyn, NY	L 7–19		
*Non-conference game

== After the season ==
=== NFL draft ===
The following Rockets were selected in the 1941 NFL draft following the season.

Round	Pick	Player	Position	NFL club
15	134	Warren Desmore	Center	Cleveland Rams
19	177	Bob Hayes	End	Green Bay Packers
