= 1940 Notre Dame Fighting Irish football team =

American college football season

1940 Notre Dame Fighting Irish football
- Conference: Independent
- Record: 7–2
- Head coach: Elmer Layden (7th season)
- Captain: Milt Piepul
- Home stadium: Notre Dame Stadium

1940 Midwestern college football independents records
	Conf.			Overall
Team	W	L	T	W		L		T
Michigan Tech		–		5	–	1	–	0
Detroit		–		7	–	2	–	0
Notre Dame		–		7	–	2	–	0
Xavier		–		7	–	3	–	0
Ohio		–		5	–	2	–	2
Wayne		–		4	–	1	–	3
Dayton		–		6	–	3	–	0
Cincinnati		–		5	–	3	–	1
Wichita		–		6	–	4	–	0
Central Michigan		–		4	–	3	–	1
Marquette		–		4	–	4	–	0
Michigan State		–		3	–	4	–	1
Ohio Wesleyan		–		2	–	4	–	3
Akron		–		2	–	5	–	2
Western State Teachers		–		2	–	5	–	0
Michigan State Normal		–		1	–	5	–	1
Miami (OH)		–		0	–	7	–	1

The 1940 Notre Dame Fighting Irish football team was an American football team that represented the University of Notre Dame as an independent during the 1940 college football season. In their seventh and final year under head coach Elmer Layden, the Irish compiled a 7–2 record and outscored opponents by a total of 168 to 67.

Back Milt Piepul was the team captain. Other notable players included Steve Juzwik, Bob Saggau, Fred Evans, Steve Bagarus, and Bernie Crimmins. Saggau led the team with 650 yards of total offense, and Juzzwik led in rushing with 407 yards and in scoring with 43 points.

Notre Dame was ranked at No. 20 (out of 697 college football teams) in the final rankings under the Litkenhous Difference by Score system for 1940.

The team played its home games at Notre Dame Stadium in Notre Dame, Indiana.

== Schedule ==
Date	Opponent	Rank	Site	Result	Attendance	Source
October 5	Pacific (CA)		Notre Dame Stadium; Notre Dame, IN	W 25–7	22,670	
October 12	Georgia Tech		Notre Dame Stadium; Notre Dame, IN (rivalry)	W 26–20	32,492	
October 19	Carnegie Tech	No. 6	Notre Dame Stadium; Notre Dame, IN	W 61–0	29,515	
October 26	at Illinois	No. 2	Memorial Stadium; Champaign, IL	W 26–0	63,186	
November 2	vs. Army	No. 2	Yankee Stadium; Bronx, NY (rivalry)	W 7–0	75,474	
November 9	vs. Navy	No. 7	Municipal Stadium; Baltimore, MD (rivalry)	W 13–7	61,579	
November 16	Iowa	No. 7	Notre Dame Stadium; Notre Dame, IN	L 0–7	45,960	
November 23	at No. 10 Northwestern	No. 14	Dyche Stadium; Evanston, IL (rivalry)	L 0–20	48,000	
December 7	at USC		Los Angeles Memorial Coliseum; Los Angeles, CA (rivalry)	W 10–6	85,808	
Rankings from AP Poll released prior to the game; Source:

== Rankings ==
Ranking movements Legend: ██ Increase in ranking ██ Decrease in ranking — = Not ranked ( ) = First-place votes
	Week							
Poll	1	2	3	4	5	6	7	Final
AP	6 (5)	2 (30)	2 (40.5)	7	7	14	—	—
