= 1940 Wittenberg Tigers football team =

American college football season

1940 Wittenberg Tigers football
- Conference: Ohio Athletic Conference
- Record: 8–0 (7–0 OAC)
- Head coach: Bill Stobbs (12th season)
- Home stadium: Wittenberg Stadium

1940 Ohio Athletic Conference football standings
	Conf.					Overall
Team	W		L		T	W		L		T
Wittenberg $	7	–	0	–	0	8	–	0	–	0
Kent State	4	–	0	–	0	8	–	1	–	0
Case	3	–	0	–	0	6	–	2	–	0
Ohio Northern	5	–	3	–	0	5	–	3	–	0
Heidelberg	5	–	3	–	0	5	–	4	–	0
Capital	3	–	2	–	1	3	–	3	–	1
Denison	3	–	2	–	1	4	–	3	–	1
Wooster	3	–	2	–	1	4	–	3	–	1
Muskingum	3	–	2	–	0	5	–	2	–	1
Toledo	1	–	1	–	0	6	–	3	–	0
Baldwin–Wallace	2	–	2	–	0	4	–	4	–	0
Bowling Green	2	–	2	–	1	3	–	4	–	1
Kenyon	1	–	2	–	1	2	–	4	–	1
Findlay	1	–	2	–	0	4	–	4	–	0
Marietta	1	–	3	–	1	1	–	5	–	1
Otterbein	1	–	4	–	0	3	–	5	–	0
Oberlin	0	–	3	–	0	4	–	3	–	0
Ashland	0	–	3	–	0	1	–	4	–	1
John Carroll	0	–	3	–	0	2	–	6	–	0
Mount Union	0	–	6	–	0	0	–	8	–	1
$ – Conference champion

The 1940 Wittenberg Tigers football team, also known as the Fighting Lutherans, represented the Wittenberg University of Springfield, Ohio, as a member of the Ohio Athletic Conference (OAC) durining the 1940 college football season. In their 12th year under head coach Bill Stobbs, the Tigers compiled an 8–0 record (7–0 in conference games) and won the OAC championship. It was the fifth undefeated season in Wittenberg football history, following prior undefeated seasons in 1918, 1919, 1920, and 1931.

== Schedule ==
Date	Opponent	Site	Result	Attendance	Source
October 5	at Bowling Green	University Stadium; Bowling Green, OH	W 14–0	5,000	
October 12	Ohio Northern	Wittenberg Stadium; Springfield, OH	W 13–0	2,500	
October 19	at Denison	Granville, OH	W 8–6		
October 26	at Lawrence Tech*	Ives Field; Highland Park, MI	W 20–0	5,000	
November 2	Oberlin^{†}	Wittenberg Stadium; Springfield, OH	W 19–7		
November 9	Marietta	Wittenberg Stadium; Springfield, OH	W 26–7		
November 16	at Mount Union	Alliance, OH	W 26–0		
November 21	Heidelberg	Wittenberg Stadium; Springfield, OH	W 35–13		
*Non-conference game; ^{†}Homecoming
