= 1940 Creighton Bluejays football team =

American college football season

1940 Creighton Bluejays football
- Conference: Missouri Valley Conference
- Record: 6–2–2 (2–2 MVC)
- Head coach: Maurice H. Palrang (1st season)
- Home stadium: Creighton Stadium

1940 Missouri Valley Conference football standings
	Conf.					Overall
Team	W		L		T	W		L		T
Tulsa $	4	–	0	–	0	7	–	3	–	0
Oklahoma A&M	4	–	1	–	0	6	–	3	–	1
Creighton	2	–	2	–	0	6	–	2	–	2
Drake	2	–	2	–	0	4	–	5	–	0
Saint Louis	2	–	3	–	0	3	–	6	–	0
Washington University	1	–	3	–	0	3	–	6	–	0
Washburn	0	–	4	–	0	4	–	6	–	0
$ – Conference champion

The 1940 Creighton Bluejays football team was an American football team that represented Creighton University as a member of the Missouri Valley Conference (MVC) during the 1940 college football season. In its first season under head coach Maurice H. Palrang, the team compiled a 6–2–2 record (2–2 against MVC opponents) and outscored opponents by a total of 178 to 79.

Creighton back Johnny Knolla led all college football players in 1940 with 1,420 yards of total offense in 10 games. His tally was higher than that of 1940 Heisman Trophy winner Tom Harmon.

Creighton was ranked at No. 91 (out of 697 college football teams) in the final rankings under the Litkenhous Difference by Score system for 1940.

The team played its home games at Creighton Stadium in Omaha, Nebraska.

== Schedule ==
Date	Opponent	Site	Result	Attendance	Source
September 28	Iowa State Teachers*	Creighton Stadium; Omaha, NE	W 20–0		
October 5	Colorado Mines*	Creighton Stadium; Omaha, NE	W 43–0		
October 12	at Tulsa	Skelly Field; Tulsa, OK	L 0–32	6,600	
October 19	Marquette*	Creighton Stadium; Omaha, NE	T 27–27		
October 27	at San Francisco*	Kezar Stadium; San Francisco, CA	T 0–0	10,000	
November 2	Oklahoma A&M	Creighton Stadium; Omaha, NE	L 14–20		
November 8	at Saint Louis	Walsh Stadium; St. Louis, MO	W 14–0	7,373	
November 16	South Dakota*	Creighton Stadium; Omaha, NE	W 39–0		
November 23	at Drake	Drake Stadium; Des Moines, IA	W 14–0	6,000	
November 28	at Wichita*	Wichita, KS	W 7–0		
*Non-conference game
