= 1940 Miami Redskins football team =

American college football season

1940 Miami Redskins football
- Conference: Independent
- Record: 0–7–1
- Head coach: Frank Wilton (9th season)
- Home stadium: Miami Field

1940 Midwestern college football independents records
	Conf.			Overall
Team	W	L	T	W		L		T
Michigan Tech		–		5	–	1	–	0
Detroit		–		7	–	2	–	0
Notre Dame		–		7	–	2	–	0
Xavier		–		7	–	3	–	0
Ohio		–		5	–	2	–	2
Wayne		–		4	–	1	–	3
Dayton		–		6	–	3	–	0
Cincinnati		–		5	–	3	–	1
Wichita		–		6	–	4	–	0
Central Michigan		–		4	–	3	–	1
Marquette		–		4	–	4	–	0
Michigan State		–		3	–	4	–	1
Ohio Wesleyan		–		2	–	4	–	3
Akron		–		2	–	5	–	2
Western State Teachers		–		2	–	5	–	0
Michigan State Normal		–		1	–	5	–	1
Miami (OH)		–		0	–	7	–	1

The 1940 Miami Redskins football team was an American football team that represented Miami University as an independent during the 1940 college football season. In its ninth season under head coach Frank Wilton, Miami compiled a 0–7–1 record.

Miami was ranked at No. 402 (out of 697 college football teams) in the final rankings under the Litkenhous Difference by Score system for 1940.

== Schedule ==
Date	Time	Opponent	Site	Result	Attendance	Source
September 21		Ball State	Miami Field; Oxford, OH	T 0–0	5,000	
September 28		Case	Miami Field; Oxford, OH	L 0–10		
October 5		at Ohio Wesleyan	Delaware, OH	L 7–24		
October 19		Dayton	Miami Field; Oxford, OH	L 6–28		
October 26	2:00 p.m.	at Western Reserve	League Park; Cleveland, OH	L 6–47	3,000	
November 2		Ohio	Miami Field; Oxford, OH (rivalry)	L 0–27	6,000	
November 9		Western State Teachers	Miami Field; Oxford, OH	L 13–20		
November 21		at Cincinnati	Nippert Stadium; Cincinnati, OH (Victory Bell)	L 0–44	12,600	
All times are in Eastern time
