= 1940 Catholic University Cardinals football team =

American college football season

1940 Catholic University Cardinals football
- Conference: Independent
- Record: 4–2–1
- Head coach: Dutch Bergman (11th season)
- Home stadium: Brookland Stadium

1940 Southern college football independents records
	Conf.			Overall
Team	W	L	T	W		L		T
No. 17 Hardin–Simmons		–		9	–	0	–	0
No. 13 Georgetown		–		8	–	2	–	0
Navy		–		6	–	2	–	1
Delaware		–		5	–	3	–	0
East Carolina		–		5	–	3	–	0
Western Maryland		–		5	–	3	–	0
George Washington		–		5	–	3	–	1
Catholic University		–		4	–	3	–	1
West Virginia		–		4	–	4	–	1
Virginia		–		4	–	5	–	0
Georgia Teachers		–		3	–	5	–	0
Roanoke		–		2	–	6	–	0
Oklahoma City		–		1	–	7	–	3
William & Mary Norfolk		–		0	–	6	–	0
Rankings from AP Poll

The 1940 Catholic University Cardinals football team was an American football team that represented the Catholic University of America as an independent during the 1940 college football season. In its 11th year under head coach Dutch Bergman, the team compiled a 4–2–1 record and outscored opponents by a total of 98 to 58.

Catholic University was ranked at No. 107 (out of 697 college football teams) in the final rankings under the Litkenhous Difference by Score system for 1940.

== Schedule ==
Date	Opponent	Site	Result	Attendance	Source
October 4	at Detroit	University of Detroit Stadium; Detroit, MI	L 0–13	19,353	
October 12	at Saint Anselm	Manchester, NH	W 6–0	3,000	
October 18	at Miami (FL)	Burdine Stadium; Miami, FL	W 20–18	21,000	
October 26	West Virginia Wesleyan	Brookland Stadium; Washington, DC	W 13–0	7,500	
November 3	at Saint Vincent	Bearcat Stadium; Latrobe, PA	T 0–0	8,000	
November 9	at Tulsa	Skelly Field; Tulsa, OK	L 6–12	6,000	
November 16	Hardin–Simmons	Brookland Stadium; Washington, DC	L 19–27	4,000	
November 23	Providence	Brookland Stadium; Washington, DC	W 40–7		
