= Chuck Stobbs =

American baseball player (1929–2008)

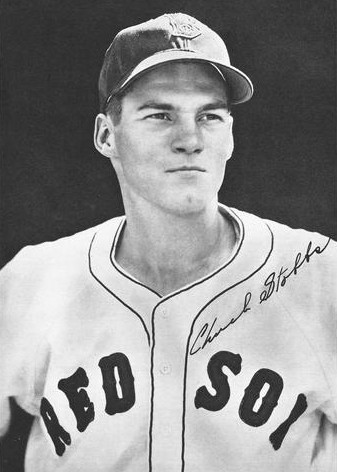
- Pitcher
- Born: July 2, 1929; Wheeling, West Virginia, U.S.
- Died: July 11, 2008 (aged 79); Sarasota, Florida, U.S.
- Batted: Left Threw: Left

MLB debut
- September 15, 1947, for the Boston Red Sox

Last MLB appearance
- August 12, 1961, for the Minnesota Twins

MLB statistics
- Win–loss record: 107–130
- Earned run average: 4.29
- Strikeouts: 897
- Stats at Baseball Reference

Teams
- Boston Red Sox (1947–1951); Chicago White Sox (1952); Washington Senators (1953–1958); St. Louis Cardinals (1958); Washington Senators / Minnesota Twins (1959–1961)

Charles Klein Stobbs (July 2, 1929 – July 11, 2008) was an American professional baseball player. He played in Major League Baseball as a pitcher for the Boston Red Sox (1947–51), Chicago White Sox (1952), Washington Senators / Minnesota Twins (1953–58, 1959–61) and St. Louis Cardinals (1958). Stobbs is notable for being the pitcher who gave up an estimated 565-foot home run to Mickey Mantle that flew entirely out of Griffith Stadium in 1953. Mantle's 565-foot shot was regarded as the first tape-measure home run of the live-ball era.

== Early life ==
Stobbs, a native of West Virginia, spent his early years in Springfield, Ohio, and Vero Beach, Florida. His father, Bill Stobbs, played professional football in 1921. As a teenager his family moved to Norfolk, Virginia, where his father took a coaching job at Granby High School.

In high school, Stobbs excelled in three sports: football, basketball and baseball. He led the Granby football team to three consecutive state championships and was named all-state quarterback three times. Stobbs was also an all-American in baseball and a two-time all-state basketball player.

In December 1946, Stobbs was quarterback for the Granby team that lost to Lynn Classical High School (quarterbacked by Harry Agganis) in the North–South Shrine Game at the Miami Orange Bowl. In 1947, Stobbs was named by The Washington Post as one of the "greatest athletes to be developed in the Virginia high schools during recent years". In 1957, The Washington Post sports columnist Bob Addie wrote that Stobbs was "one of the greatest athletes ever to come out of Virginia." For his storied high-school career, Stobbs was later named to the Virginia Sports Hall of Fame in 2002.

== Major League Baseball career ==
Stobbs declined several college scholarships to play with the Boston Red Sox under the supervision of scout Specs Toporcer, who offered him a $50,000 signing bonus, one of the first players to qualify for baseball's bonus rule. Stobbs was only 18 years old when he pitched in his first big-league game, against the Chicago White Sox on September 15, 1947. He was the youngest player in Major League Baseball that year, appearing in four games. Stobbs played in six games in 1948 before being a full-time starter for the Red Sox in 1949. That season, Stobbs participated in 26 games, starting 19. He had an 11–6 win–loss record with a 4.03 earned run average while striking out 70 batters in 152 innings pitched.

He was turned down for service by the United States Army for the Korean War because of an asthmatic condition. Stobbs' production diminished in 1957, as he won eight games and led the league in losses with 20. He had a 16-game consecutive losing streak dating back to the previous September. In his last game of the 1957 season, Stobbs pitched 10 innings against the Baltimore Orioles before losing the game 7-3. That season he lost 20 games and joined the St. Louis Cardinals the next year after being purchased by the team. He rejoined the Senators prior to the 1959 season, and stayed in the organization through 1961, when the Senators moved to Minnesota. bHe led the American League in walks per nine innings pitched (2.03) in 1956 and led the American League in losses (20) and earned runs allowed (126) in 1957.

== Post-career ==
After leaving professional baseball, Stobbs spent a brief time as an insurance salesman and a coach at George Washington University.

In 1971, Stobbs moved to Florida and worked at a baseball academy operated by the Kansas City Royals. He was a coach at Sho-Me Baseball camp in Branson Missouri in the 1970s.He worked for the Cleveland Indians as a pitching coach in the minor leagues in the early 1980s.

Stobbs died after a seven-year battle with throat cancer on July 11, 2008.
