= 1940 Georgetown Hoyas football team =

American college football season

1940 Georgetown Hoyas football

Orange Bowl, L 7–14 vs. Mississippi State
- Conference: Independent

Ranking
- AP: No. 13
- Record: 8–2
- Head coach: Jack Hagerty (9th season)
- Captain: Game captains
- Home stadium: Griffith Stadium

1940 Southern college football independents records
	Conf.			Overall
Team	W	L	T	W		L		T
No. 17 Hardin–Simmons		–		9	–	0	–	0
No. 13 Georgetown		–		8	–	2	–	0
Navy		–		6	–	2	–	1
Delaware		–		5	–	3	–	0
East Carolina		–		5	–	3	–	0
Western Maryland		–		5	–	3	–	0
George Washington		–		5	–	3	–	1
Catholic University		–		4	–	3	–	1
West Virginia		–		4	–	4	–	1
Virginia		–		4	–	5	–	0
Georgia Teachers		–		3	–	5	–	0
Roanoke		–		2	–	6	–	0
Oklahoma City		–		1	–	7	–	3
William & Mary Norfolk		–		0	–	6	–	0
Rankings from AP Poll

The 1940 Georgetown Hoyas football team was an American football team that represented Georgetown University as an independent during the 1940 college football season. In their ninth year under head coach Jack Hagerty, the Hoyas compiled an 8–2 record, were ranked No. 14 in the final AP poll, and lost to Mississippi State in the 1941 Orange Bowl. It was the only ranked finish in Georgetown football history. The season was part of a two-year, 23-game unbeaten streak that ended in a loss to eventual co-national champion Boston College.

Guard Augie Lio was selected by Collier's Weekly and the New York Sun as a first-team player on the 1940 All-America team. He received second-team All-America honors from the International News Service, United Press, Central Press, and Newspaper Enterprise Association. He was later inducted into the College Football Hall of Fame. He was also selected by the Associated Press as a first-team player on the 1940 All-Eastern football team.

The team played its home games at Griffith Stadium in Washington, D.C.

== Schedule ==
Date	Time	Opponent	Rank	Site	Result	Attendance	Source
September 28		Roanoke		Griffith Stadium; Washington, DC	W 66–0		
October 4		at Temple		Temple Stadium; Philadelphia, PA	W 14–0	20,000	
October 12		Waynesburg		Griffith Stadium; Washington, DC	W 26–12		
October 19	8:30 p.m.	VPI		Griffith Stadium; Washington, DC	W 46–4	15,000	
October 26		at NYU	No. 15	Yankee Stadium; Bronx, NY	W 26–0	11,000	
November 2		at Syracuse	No. 10	Archbold Stadium; Syracuse, NY	W 28–6	17,000	
November 9		at Maryland	No. 9	Old Byrd Stadium; College Park, MD	W 41–0	9,000	
November 16		at No. 8 Boston College	No. 9	Fenway Park; Boston, MA	L 18–19	43,000	
November 23		vs. George Washington	No. 9	Griffith Stadium; Washington, DC	W 8–0		
January 1		vs. No. 11 Mississippi State	No. 13	Burdine Stadium; Miami, FL (Orange Bowl)	L 7–14	38,307	
Rankings from AP Poll released prior to the game

== Rankings ==
Ranking movements Legend: ██ Increase in ranking ██ Decrease in ranking — = Not ranked т = Tied with team above or below ( ) = First-place votes
	Week							
Poll	1	2	3	4	5	6	7	Final
AP	—	15	10т (2)	9	9	9	9	13
