= 1940 West Virginia Mountaineers football team =

American college football season

1940 West Virginia Mountaineers football
- Conference: Independent
- Record: 4–4–1
- Head coach: Bill Kern (1st season)
- Captain: John Shonk
- Home stadium: Mountaineer Field

1940 Southern college football independents records
	Conf.			Overall
Team	W	L	T	W		L		T
No. 17 Hardin–Simmons		–		9	–	0	–	0
No. 13 Georgetown		–		8	–	2	–	0
Navy		–		6	–	2	–	1
Delaware		–		5	–	3	–	0
East Carolina		–		5	–	3	–	0
Western Maryland		–		5	–	3	–	0
George Washington		–		5	–	3	–	1
Catholic University		–		4	–	3	–	1
West Virginia		–		4	–	4	–	1
Virginia		–		4	–	5	–	0
Georgia Teachers		–		3	–	5	–	0
Roanoke		–		2	–	6	–	0
Oklahoma City		–		1	–	7	–	3
William & Mary Norfolk		–		0	–	6	–	0
Rankings from AP Poll

The 1940 West Virginia Mountaineers football team was an American football team that represented West Virginia University as an independent during the 1940 college football season. In its first season under head coach Bill Kern, the team compiled a 4–4–1 record and outscored opponents by a total of 127 to 94. John Shonk was the team captain. The team played home games at Mountaineer Field in Morgantown, West Virginia.

West Virginia was ranked at No. 95 (out of 697 college football teams) in the final rankings under the Litkenhous Difference by Score system for 1940.

== Schedule ==
Date	Opponent	Site	Result	Attendance	Source
September 28	Westminster (PA)	Mountaineer Field; Morgantown, WV	W 47–0	7,109	
October 5	at Fordham	Randalls Island Stadium; New York, NY	L 7–20	17,780	
October 12	at Penn State	New Beaver Field; State College, PA (rivalry)	L 13–17	10,574–13,000	
October 19	West Virginia Wesleyan	Mountaineer Field; Morgantown, WV	W 32–0		
October 25	at George Washington	Griffith Stadium; Washington, DC	L 0–19		
November 2	vs. Washington and Lee	Laidley Field; Charleston, WV	W 12–7		
November 9	Cincinnati	Mountaineer Field; Morgantown, WV	T 7–7	10,000	
November 17	Kentucky^{†}	Mountaineer Field; Morgantown, WV	W 9–7	7,500	
November 23	at Michigan State	Macklin Field; East Lansing, MI	L 0–17	9,500	
^{†}Homecoming
