= 1941 Orange Bowl =

American college football game

- 7th Orange Bowl
- Burdine Stadium in Miami, Florida, hosted the Orange Bowl.
Georgetown Hoyas	Mississippi State Maroons
(8–1)	(9–0–1)
Independent	SEC
7	14
Head coach: Jack Hagerty	Head coach: Allyn McKeen
AP 13	AP 9
	1	2	3	4	Total
Georgetown	0	0	7	0	7
Mississippi State	7	7	0	0	14
- Date: January 1, 1941
- Season: 1940
- Stadium: Burdine Stadium
- Location: Miami, Florida
- Referee: Emil H. Heintz (ECAC; (split crew: ECAC, SEC)
- Attendance: 29,554

The 1941 Orange Bowl was a college football postseason bowl game between the Mississippi State Maroons and the Georgetown Hoyas.

== Background ==
The Maroons finished second in the Southeastern Conference, as first-place winner Tennessee played in the Sugar Bowl. This was Mississippi State's first bowl game since 1937.

== Game summary ==
Jim Daniels was set to punt the ball from his end zone when Hunter Corhern blocked the punt and John Tripson recovered the ball in the end zone for a touchdown. Billy Jefferson increased the lead on a 2-yard touchdown dive. A key play called back proved to be costly for the Hoyas. Georgetown QB Julius Koshlap hit Arthur Lenski for 46 yards to the Mississippi State 4. It was called back due to the referee claiming Koshlap was not 5 yards behind the line of scrimmage before throwing the ball (which was a rule at the time). Jimmy Castiglia narrowed the lead to 14–7 on his touchdown run, but the Maroons held the Hoyas to no more points, winning their first ever bowl game.

== Aftermath ==
The Maroons (who changed their name to Bulldogs in 1960) did not make a bowl game again until 1963 and an Orange Bowl until 2014. Georgetown did not make a bowl game again until 1950.

== Statistics ==
Statistics	Mississippi State	Georgetown
First downs	8	14
Rushing yards	106	125
Passing yards	52	104
Total offense	158	229
Interceptions	0	3
Punts–average	11–36.8	8–28.2
Fumbles–lost	2–0	1–0
Penalties–yards	11–71	8–90
