= 1940 Central Michigan Bearcats football team =

American college football season

1940 Central Michigan Bearcats football
- Conference: Independent
- Record: 4–3–1
- Head coach: Ron Finch (4th season)
- Home stadium: Alumni Field

1940 Midwestern college football independents records
	Conf.			Overall
Team	W	L	T	W		L		T
Michigan Tech		–		5	–	1	–	0
Detroit		–		7	–	2	–	0
Notre Dame		–		7	–	2	–	0
Xavier		–		7	–	3	–	0
Ohio		–		5	–	2	–	2
Wayne		–		4	–	1	–	3
Dayton		–		6	–	3	–	0
Cincinnati		–		5	–	3	–	1
Wichita		–		6	–	4	–	0
Central Michigan		–		4	–	3	–	1
Marquette		–		4	–	4	–	0
Michigan State		–		3	–	4	–	1
Ohio Wesleyan		–		2	–	4	–	3
Akron		–		2	–	5	–	2
Western State Teachers		–		2	–	5	–	0
Michigan State Normal		–		1	–	5	–	1
Miami (OH)		–		0	–	7	–	1

The 1940 Central Michigan Bearcats football team represented Central Michigan College of Education, later renamed Central Michigan University, as an independent during the 1940 college football season. In their fourth season under head coach Ron Finch, the Bearcats compiled a 4–3–1 record and were outscored by their opponents by a combined total of 88 to 60. The team achieved shut out victories over Ferris State (37–0), Ball State (7–0), Michigan State Normal (24–0), and DeSales (7–0), tied Wayne State (7–7), and lost to Northern Illinois (6–9), Bradley (0–19), and Eastern Kentucky (0–25).

Central Michigan was ranked at No. 271 (out of 697 college football teams) in the final rankings under the Litkenhous Difference by Score system for 1940.

== Schedule ==
Date	Opponent	Site	Result	Attendance	Source
September 27	Ferris Institute	Alumni Field; Mount Pleasant, MI	W 37–0		
October 5	at Ball State	Ball State Field; Muncie, IN	W 7–0		
October 12	at Northern Illinois	Glidden Field; DeKalb, IL	L 6–9		
October 19	at Bradley	Peoria, IL	L 0–19		
October 24	Michigan State Normal	Alumni Field; Mount Pleasant, MI (rivalry)	W 24–0		
November 2	at Wayne	Keyworth Stadium; Hamtramck, MI	T 7–7	3,500	
November 9	Eastern Kentucky^{†}	Alumni Field; Mount Pleasant, MI	L 0–25		
November 16	DeSales (OH)	Columbus, OH	W 7–0		
^{†}Homecoming
