= 1940 Washington University Bears football team =

American college football season

1940 Washington University Bears football
- Conference: Missouri Valley Conference
- Record: 3–6 (1–3 MVC)
- Head coach: Frank Loebs (1st season)
- Home stadium: Francis Field

1940 Missouri Valley Conference football standings
	Conf.					Overall
Team	W		L		T	W		L		T
Tulsa $	4	–	0	–	0	7	–	3	–	0
Oklahoma A&M	4	–	1	–	0	6	–	3	–	1
Creighton	2	–	2	–	0	6	–	2	–	2
Drake	2	–	2	–	0	4	–	5	–	0
Saint Louis	2	–	3	–	0	3	–	6	–	0
Washington University	1	–	3	–	0	3	–	6	–	0
Washburn	0	–	4	–	0	4	–	6	–	0
$ – Conference champion

The 1940 Washington University Bears football team represented Washington University in St. Louis as a member of the Missouri Valley Conference (MVC) during the 1940 college football season. Led by first-year head coach Frank Loebs, the Bears compiled an overall record of 3–6 with a mark of 1–3 in conference play, placing sixth in the MVC. Washington University played home games at Francis Field in St. Louis.

== Schedule ==
Date	Time	Opponent	Site	Result	Attendance	Source
October 5		Maryville (MO)*	Francis Field; St. Louis, MO	L 6–7	3,500	
October 12	2:30 p.m.	Washburn	Francis Field; St. Louis, MO	W 28–20	3,000	
October 19	2:30 p.m.	at Oklahoma A&M	Lewis Field; Stillwater, OK	L 12–53	7,000	
October 26	2:30 p.m.	Butler*	Francis Field; St. Louis, MO	W 27–19	5,000	
November 2	2:00 p.m.	Centenary*	Francis Field; St. Louis, MO	L 14–19	3,000	
November 9	2:00 p.m.	VMI*^{†}	Francis Field; St. Louis, MO	L 13–20	2,500	
November 16	2:00 p.m.	Drake	Francis Field; St. Louis, MO	L 14–20	4,000	
November 23	2:00 p.m.	Missouri Mines*	Francis Field; St. Louis, MO	W 12–0	1,800	
November 30	2:00 p.m.	at Saint Louis	Walsh Stadium; St. Louis, MO	L 0–3	11,050	
*Non-conference game; ^{†}Homecoming; All times are in Central time
