= 1940 Bowling Green Falcons football team =

American college football season

1940 Bowling Green Falcons football
- Conference: Ohio Athletic Conference
- Record: 3–4–1 (2–2–1 OAC)
- Head coach: Harry Ockerman (6th season)
- Captain: Steve Brudzinski
- Home stadium: University Stadium

1940 Ohio Athletic Conference football standings
	Conf.					Overall
Team	W		L		T	W		L		T
Wittenberg $	7	–	0	–	0	8	–	0	–	0
Kent State	4	–	0	–	0	8	–	1	–	0
Case	3	–	0	–	0	6	–	2	–	0
Ohio Northern	5	–	3	–	0	5	–	3	–	0
Heidelberg	5	–	3	–	0	5	–	4	–	0
Capital	3	–	2	–	1	3	–	3	–	1
Denison	3	–	2	–	1	4	–	3	–	1
Wooster	3	–	2	–	1	4	–	3	–	1
Muskingum	3	–	2	–	0	5	–	2	–	1
Toledo	1	–	1	–	0	6	–	3	–	0
Baldwin–Wallace	2	–	2	–	0	4	–	4	–	0
Bowling Green	2	–	2	–	1	3	–	4	–	1
Kenyon	1	–	2	–	1	2	–	4	–	1
Findlay	1	–	2	–	0	4	–	4	–	0
Marietta	1	–	3	–	1	1	–	5	–	1
Otterbein	1	–	4	–	0	3	–	5	–	0
Oberlin	0	–	3	–	0	4	–	3	–	0
Ashland	0	–	3	–	0	1	–	4	–	1
John Carroll	0	–	3	–	0	2	–	6	–	0
Mount Union	0	–	6	–	0	0	–	8	–	1
$ – Conference champion

The 1940 Bowling Green Falcons football team was an American football team that represented Bowling Green State College (later renamed Bowling Green State University) in the Ohio Athletic Conference (OAC) during the 1940 college football season. In their sixth season under head coach Harry Ockerman, the Falcons compiled a 3–4–1 record, finished in 11th place out of 19 teams in the OAC, and were outscored by a total of 122 to 62. Steve Brudzinski was the team captain.

Bowling Green was ranked at No. 429 (out of 697 college football teams) in the final rankings under the Litkenhous Difference by Score system for 1940.

The team played its home games at University Stadium in Bowling Green, Ohio.

== Schedule ==
Date	Time	Opponent	Site	Result	Attendance	Source
October 5		Wittenberg	University Stadium; Bowling Green, OH	L 0–14	5,000	
October 11		at Findlay	Findlay, OH	W 14–7		
October 19		Michigan State Normal	University Stadium; Bowling Green, OH	W 15–0	3,500	
October 26		at Capital	Columbus, OH	T 7–7	3,000	
November 2		Kent State	University Stadium; Bowling Green, OH (rivalry)	L 0–13		
November 9		at Wooster	Wooster, OH	W 26–14		
November 16	2:00 p.m.	at Eastern Kentucky	Hanger Stadium; Richmond, KY	L 0–48		
November 21		at Wayne	Keyworth Stadium; Hamtramck, MI	L 0–19	6,000	
All times are in Eastern time
