= 1940 Western State Teachers Broncos football team =

American college football season

1940 Western State Teachers Broncos football
- Conference: Independent
- Record: 2–5
- Head coach: Mike Gary (12th season)
- MVP: Horace Coleman
- Captains: Wayne Falan; Harold Benge
- Home stadium: Waldo Stadium

1940 Midwestern college football independents records
	Conf.			Overall
Team	W	L	T	W		L		T
Michigan Tech		–		5	–	1	–	0
Detroit		–		7	–	2	–	0
Notre Dame		–		7	–	2	–	0
Xavier		–		7	–	3	–	0
Ohio		–		5	–	2	–	2
Wayne		–		4	–	1	–	3
Dayton		–		6	–	3	–	0
Cincinnati		–		5	–	3	–	1
Wichita		–		6	–	4	–	0
Central Michigan		–		4	–	3	–	1
Marquette		–		4	–	4	–	0
Michigan State		–		3	–	4	–	1
Ohio Wesleyan		–		2	–	4	–	3
Akron		–		2	–	5	–	2
Western State Teachers		–		2	–	5	–	0
Michigan State Normal		–		1	–	5	–	1
Miami (OH)		–		0	–	7	–	1

The 1940 Western State Teachers Broncos football team represented Western State Teachers College (later renamed Western Michigan University) as an independent during the 1940 college football season. In their 12th season under head coach Mike Gary, the Broncos compiled a 2–5 record and were outscored by their opponents, 117 to 77. The team played its home games at Waldo Stadium in Kalamazoo, Michigan.

Guard Wayne Falan and guard/quarterback Harold Benge were the team captains. Halfback Horace Coleman received the team's most outstanding player award.

Western State was ranked at No. 267 (out of 697 college football teams) in the final rankings under the Litkenhous Difference by Score system for 1940.

== Schedule ==
Date	Opponent	Site	Result	Attendance	Source
October 5	Wayne	Waldo Stadium; Kalamazoo, MI	L 6–13		
October 12	at Ohio	Peden Stadium; Athens, OH	L 7–20		
October 19	Iowa State Teachers	Waldo Stadium; Kalamazoo, MI	L 19–20		
October 26	Toledo	Waldo Stadium; Kalamazoo, MI	L 0–12		
November 2	at Western Kentucky	Bowling Green, KY	L 6–25		
November 9	at Miami (OH)	Miami Field; Oxford, OH	W 20–13		
November 16	Manchester	Waldo Stadium; Kalamazoo, MI	W 19–14		
