= 1940 Hardin–Simmons Cowboys football team =

American college football season

1940 Hardin–Simmons Cowboys football
- Conference: Independent

Ranking
- AP: No. 17
- Record: 9–0
- Head coach: Frank Kimbrough (6th season)

1940 Southern college football independents records
	Conf.			Overall
Team	W	L	T	W		L		T
No. 17 Hardin–Simmons		–		9	–	0	–	0
No. 13 Georgetown		–		8	–	2	–	0
Navy		–		6	–	2	–	1
Delaware		–		5	–	3	–	0
East Carolina		–		5	–	3	–	0
Western Maryland		–		5	–	3	–	0
George Washington		–		5	–	3	–	1
Catholic University		–		4	–	3	–	1
West Virginia		–		4	–	4	–	1
Virginia		–		4	–	5	–	0
Georgia Teachers		–		3	–	5	–	0
Roanoke		–		2	–	6	–	0
Oklahoma City		–		1	–	7	–	3
William & Mary Norfolk		–		0	–	6	–	0
Rankings from AP Poll

The 1940 Hardin–Simmons Cowboys football team represented Hardin–Simmons University as an independent during the 1940 college football season. In its sixth and final season under head coach Frank Kimbrough, the team compiled a perfect 9–0 record, outscored opponents by a total of 235 to 76, and was ranked No. 17 in the final AP Poll. In January 1941, Coach Kimbrough left Hardin–Simmons to become head football coach at Baylor University. Kimbrough compiled a 47–8–3 in six seasons at Hardin-Simmons.

Hardin–Simmons was ranked at No. 55 (out of 697 college football teams) in the final rankings under the Litkenhous Difference by Score system for 1940.

== Schedule ==
Date	Time	Opponent	Rank	Site	Result	Attendance	Source
September 14		Daniel Baker		Abilene, TX	W 33–0		
September 21		at Centenary		Centenary Field; Shreveport, LA	W 15–13	6,000	
October 5		vs. Arizona State		Texas Rose Festival; Tyler, TX	W 17–0	12,500	
October 12		vs. Texas Mines		Fly Field; Odessa, TX	W 14–6	3,000	
November 2	2:30 p.m.	at West Texas State		Buffalo Stadium; Canyon, TX	W 28–7		
November 8		at Loyola (CA)		Gilmore Stadium; Los Angeles, CA	W 40–6	10,000	
November 16		at Catholic University		Brookland Stadium; Washington, DC	W 27–19	4,000	
November 23		San Francisco ^{†}		Abilene, TX	W 28–18	3,000	
November 30		at Howard Payne	No. 20	Brownwood, TX	W 27–7		
^{†}Homecoming; Rankings from AP Poll released prior to the game; All times are in Central time

== Rankings ==
Ranking movements Legend: ██ Increase in ranking ██ Decrease in ranking — = Not ranked т = Tied with team above or below
	Week							
Poll	1	2	3	4	5	6	7	Final
AP	—	—	—	—	—	—	20т	17
