= 1940 William & Mary Norfolk Division Braves football team =

American college football season

1940 William & Mary Norfolk Division Braves football
- Conference: Independent
- Record: 0–6
- Head coach: Tommy Scott (11th season)
- Home stadium: Foreman Field

1940 Southern college football independents records
	Conf.			Overall
Team	W	L	T	W		L		T
No. 17 Hardin–Simmons		–		9	–	0	–	0
No. 13 Georgetown		–		8	–	2	–	0
Navy		–		6	–	2	–	1
Delaware		–		5	–	3	–	0
East Carolina		–		5	–	3	–	0
Western Maryland		–		5	–	3	–	0
George Washington		–		5	–	3	–	1
Catholic University		–		4	–	3	–	1
West Virginia		–		4	–	4	–	1
Virginia		–		4	–	5	–	0
Georgia Teachers		–		3	–	5	–	0
Roanoke		–		2	–	6	–	0
Oklahoma City		–		1	–	7	–	3
William & Mary Norfolk		–		0	–	6	–	0
Rankings from AP Poll

The 1940 William & Mary Norfolk Division Braves football team represented the Norfolk Division of the College of William & Mary, now referred to as Old Dominion University, during the 1940 college football season. They finished with a 0–6 record, and went all six games without scoring a single point; they also allowed no less than eighteen points in every game.

William & Mary Norfolk was ranked at No. 687 (out of 697 college football teams) in the final rankings under the Litkenhous Difference by Score system for 1940.

This was the last season of football for Old Dominion until they reinstated the football program 69 years later, in 2009.

== Schedule ==
Date	Opponent	Site	Result	Source
October 4	High Point	Foreman Field; Norfolk, VA	L 0–33	
October 12	East Carolina	Foreman Field; Norfolk, VA	L 0–18	
October 19	Belmont Abbey	Foreman Field; Norfolk, VA	L 0–48	
October 26	Apprentice	Foreman Field; Norfolk, VA	L 0–21	
November 8	Bergen College	Foreman Field; Norfolk, VA	L 0–21	
November 16	at Bluefield	Mitchell Stadium; Bluefield, VA	L 0–25	
