= 1940 Roanoke Maroons football team =

American college football season

1940 Roanoke Maroons football
- Conference: Independent
- Record: 2–6
- Head coach: Gordon C. White (11th season)
- Home stadium: College Field

1940 Southern college football independents records
	Conf.			Overall
Team	W	L	T	W		L		T
No. 17 Hardin–Simmons		–		9	–	0	–	0
No. 13 Georgetown		–		8	–	2	–	0
Navy		–		6	–	2	–	1
Delaware		–		5	–	3	–	0
East Carolina		–		5	–	3	–	0
Western Maryland		–		5	–	3	–	0
George Washington		–		5	–	3	–	1
Catholic University		–		4	–	3	–	1
West Virginia		–		4	–	4	–	1
Virginia		–		4	–	5	–	0
Georgia Teachers		–		3	–	5	–	0
Roanoke		–		2	–	6	–	0
Oklahoma City		–		1	–	7	–	3
William & Mary Norfolk		–		0	–	6	–	0
Rankings from AP Poll

The 1940 Roanoke Maroons football team represented Roanoke College as an independent during the 1940 college football season. Led by 11th-year head coach Gordon C. White, the Maroons compiled an overall record of 2–6.

== Schedule ==
Date	Opponent	Site	Result	Attendance	Source
September 21	at VMI	Alumni Field; Lexington, VA	L 0–33	4,500	
September 28	at Georgetown	Griffith Stadium; Washington, DC	L 0–66		
October 4	at Lenoir–Rhyne	L–R Field; Hickory, NC	L 13–19		
October 12	Concord State	College Field; Salem, VA	L 14–26	2,000	
October 26	at Dickinson	Biddle Field; Carlisle, PA	L 0–6	2,700	
November 2	King	College Field; Salem, VA	W 20–13		
November 8	at Apprentice	Apprentice Field; Newport News, VA	W 22–18		
November 16	Catawba	College Field; Salem, VA	L 6–13		
