= 1940 Virginia Cavaliers football team =

American college football season

1940 Virginia Cavaliers football
- Conference: Independent
- Record: 4–5
- Head coach: Frank Murray (4th season)
- Captain: Lee McLaughlin
- Home stadium: Scott Stadium

1940 Southern college football independents records
	Conf.			Overall
Team	W	L	T	W		L		T
No. 17 Hardin–Simmons		–		9	–	0	–	0
No. 13 Georgetown		–		8	–	2	–	0
Navy		–		6	–	2	–	1
Delaware		–		5	–	3	–	0
East Carolina		–		5	–	3	–	0
Western Maryland		–		5	–	3	–	0
George Washington		–		5	–	3	–	1
Catholic University		–		4	–	3	–	1
West Virginia		–		4	–	4	–	1
Virginia		–		4	–	5	–	0
Georgia Teachers		–		3	–	5	–	0
Roanoke		–		2	–	6	–	0
Oklahoma City		–		1	–	7	–	3
William & Mary Norfolk		–		0	–	6	–	0
Rankings from AP Poll

The 1940 Virginia Cavaliers football team represented the University of Virginia during the 1940 college football season. The Cavaliers were led by fourth-year head coach Frank Murray and played their home games at Scott Stadium in Charlottesville, Virginia. They competed as independents, finishing with a record of 4–5.

Virginia was ranked at No. 97 (out of 697 college football teams) in the final rankings under the Litkenhous Difference by Score system for 1940.

== Schedule ==
Date	Opponent	Site	Result	Attendance	Source
September 28	Lehigh	Scott Stadium; Charlottesville, VA	W 32–0	10,000	
October 5	at Yale	Yale Bowl; New Haven, CT	W 19–14	25,000	
October 12	at Maryland	Old Byrd Stadium; College Park, MD (rivalry)	W 19–6		
October 19	VMI^{†}	Scott Stadium; Charlottesville, VA	L 0–7	18,000	
October 26	at William & Mary	Cary Field; Williamsburg, VA	L 6–13	11,000	
November 2	vs. VPI	Foreman Field; Norfolk, VA (rivalry)	L 0–6	9,000	
November 9	Washington and Lee	Scott Stadium; Charlottesville, VA	W 20–6		
November 16	at No. 5 Tennessee	Shields–Watkins Field; Knoxville, TN	L 14–41	7,000	
November 23	North Carolina	Scott Stadium; Charlottesville, VA (rivalry)	L 7–10	12,000	
^{†}Homecoming; Rankings from AP Poll released prior to the game
