= Jack Hagerty =

American football player, coach, and administrator (1903–1982)

Biographical details
- Born: July 3, 1903; Boston, Massachusetts, U.S.
- Died: March 23, 1982 (aged 78); Washington, D.C., U.S.

Playing career
- 1923–1925: Georgetown
- 1926–1932: New York Giants
- Position: Halfback

Coaching career (HC unless noted)
- 1932–1948: Georgetown

Administrative career (AD unless noted)
- 1946–1947: Georgetown
- 1949–1969: Georgetown

Head coaching record
- Overall: 62–41–10
- Bowls: 0–1

John Leo Hagerty (July 3, 1903 – March 23, 1982) was an American football player, coach and college athletics administrator. He played halfback for the New York Giants of the National Football League (NFL) from 1926 to 1932 before returning to his alma mater of Georgetown University to serve as head football coach from 1932 to 1948. Hagerty led the Hoyas to back-to-back undefeated seasons in 1938 and 1939, as well as the school's first bowl game appearance, at the 1941 Orange Bowl, which Georgetown lost to Mississippi State, 14–7. His career record as Georgetown's coach was 62–41–10.

Hagerty attended Dorchester High School in Dorchester, Boston, Massachusetts. He died at Georgetown University Hospital on March 23, 1982.

== Head coaching record ==
| Year | Team | Overall | Conference | Standing | Bowl/playoffs | AP^{#} |
|---|---|---|---|---|---|---|
Georgetown Hoyas (Independent) (1932–1948)
| 1932 | Georgetown | 0–3–1 (Note: Tommy Mills led Georgetown to a record of 2–3 before resigning as head coach after five games. Hagerty served as head coach for the final four games of the 1932 season. Georgetown finished the year with an overall record of 2–6–1.) | | | | |
| 1933 | Georgetown | 1–6–1 | | | | |
| 1934 | Georgetown | 4–3–1 | | | | |
| 1935 | Georgetown | 4–4 | | | | |
| 1936 | Georgetown | 6–2–1 | | | | |
| 1937 | Georgetown | 2–4–2 | | | | |
| 1938 | Georgetown | 8–0 | | | | |
| 1939 | Georgetown | 7–0–1 | | | | |
| 1940 | Georgetown | 8–2 | | | L Orange | 13 |
| 1941 | Georgetown | 5–4 | | | | |
| 1942 | Georgetown | 5–3–1 | | | | |
| 1943 | No team—World War II | | | | | |
| 1944 | No team—World War II | | | | | |
| 1945 | No team—World War II | | | | | |
| 1946 | Georgetown | 5–3 | | | | |
| 1947 | Georgetown | 3–4–1 | | | | |
| 1948 | Georgetown | 3–4–1 | | | | |
| Georgetown: | | 62–41–10 | | | | |
| Total: | | 62–41–10 | | | | |
^{#}Rankings from final AP Poll.
