= 1940 Michigan State Normal Hurons football team =

American college football season

1940 Michigan State Normal Hurons football
- Conference: Independent
- Record: 1–5–1
- Head coach: Elton Rynearson (19th season)
- Captain: Walter Siera
- Home stadium: Briggs Field

1940 Midwestern college football independents records
	Conf.			Overall
Team	W	L	T	W		L		T
Michigan Tech		–		5	–	1	–	0
Detroit		–		7	–	2	–	0
Notre Dame		–		7	–	2	–	0
Xavier		–		7	–	3	–	0
Ohio		–		5	–	2	–	2
Wayne		–		4	–	1	–	3
Dayton		–		6	–	3	–	0
Cincinnati		–		5	–	3	–	1
Wichita		–		6	–	4	–	0
Central Michigan		–		4	–	3	–	1
Marquette		–		4	–	4	–	0
Michigan State		–		3	–	4	–	1
Ohio Wesleyan		–		2	–	4	–	3
Akron		–		2	–	5	–	2
Western State Teachers		–		2	–	5	–	0
Michigan State Normal		–		1	–	5	–	1
Miami (OH)		–		0	–	7	–	1

The 1940 Michigan State Normal Hurons football team represented Michigan State Normal College (later renamed Eastern Michigan University) as an independent during the 1940 college football season. In their 19th season under head coach Elton Rynearson, the Hurons compiled a record of 1–5–1, failed to score in four of seven games, and were outscored by all opponents by a combined total of 125 to 34. Walter Siera was the team captain. The team played its home games at Briggs Field on the school's campus in Ypsilanti, Michigan.

Michigan State Normal was ranked at No. 427 (out of 697 college football teams) in the final rankings under the Litkenhous Difference by Score system for 1940.

== Schedule ==
Date	Opponent	Site	Result	Attendance	Source
October 4	Illinois State Normal	Briggs Field; Ypsilanti, MI	T 0–0		
October 11	at Detroit	University of Detroit Stadium; Detroit, MI	L 0–47	16,341	
October 19	at Bowling Green	Bowling Green, OH	L 0–15	3,500	
October 25	at Central Michigan	Mount Pleasant, MI (rivalry)	L 0–24		
November 2	Alma ^{†}	Briggs Field; Ypsilanti, MI	W 24–7		
November 9	Wayne	Briggs Field; Ypsilanti, MI	L 7–19		
November 15	Kalamazoo	Briggs Field; Ypsilanti, MI	L 3–13		
^{†}Homecoming
