= 1940 Xavier Musketeers football team =

American college football season

1940 Xavier Musketeers football
- Conference: Independent
- Record: 7–3
- Head coach: Clem Crowe (6th season)
- Home stadium: Xavier Stadium

1940 Midwestern college football independents records
	Conf.			Overall
Team	W	L	T	W		L		T
Michigan Tech		–		5	–	1	–	0
Detroit		–		7	–	2	–	0
Notre Dame		–		7	–	2	–	0
Xavier		–		7	–	3	–	0
Ohio		–		5	–	2	–	2
Wayne		–		4	–	1	–	3
Dayton		–		6	–	3	–	0
Cincinnati		–		5	–	3	–	1
Wichita		–		6	–	4	–	0
Central Michigan		–		4	–	3	–	1
Marquette		–		4	–	4	–	0
Michigan State		–		3	–	4	–	1
Ohio Wesleyan		–		2	–	4	–	3
Akron		–		2	–	5	–	2
Western State Teachers		–		2	–	5	–	0
Michigan State Normal		–		1	–	5	–	1
Miami (OH)		–		0	–	7	–	1

The 1940 Xavier Musketeers football team was an American football team that represented Xavier University as an independent during the 1940 college football season. In its sixth season under head coach Clem Crowe, the team compiled a 7–3 record and outscored opponents by a total of 105 to 82.

Xavier was ranked No. 124 (out of 697 college football teams) in the final rankings under the Litkenhous Difference by Score system for 1940.

== Schedule ==
Date	Time	Opponent	Site	Result	Attendance	Source
September 20	8:30 p.m.	Georgetown (KY)	Xavier Stadium; Cincinnati, OH	W 20–0		
September 27		Kentucky	Xavier Stadium; Cincinnati, OH	L 0–13	12,000	
October 6		Saint Joseph's (IN)	Xavier Stadium; Cincinnati, OH	W 19–6		
October 12		at Butler	Sellick Bowl; Indianapolis, IN	W 13–6		
October 20		Saint Vincent (PA)	Xavier Stadium; Cincinnati, OH	W 15–3	6,000	
October 27		John Carroll	Xavier Stadium; Cincinnati, OH	W 20–0		
November 2		Ohio Wesleyan	Xavier Stadium; Cincinnati, OH	W 12–0	8,000	
November 9		at Dayton	UD Stadium; Dayton, OH	L 0–13	7,500	
November 16		at Marshall	Fairfield Stadium; Huntington, WV	L 0–41	6,000	
November 21		Ohio	Xavier Stadium; Cincinnati, OH	W 6–0	8,000	
All times are in Eastern time
