= 1940 Navy Midshipmen football team =

American college football season

1940 Navy Midshipmen football
- Conference: Independent
- Record: 6–2–1
- Head coach: Swede Larson (2nd season)
- Captain: Dick Foster
- Home stadium: Thompson Stadium

1940 Southern college football independents records
	Conf.			Overall
Team	W	L	T	W		L		T
No. 17 Hardin–Simmons		–		9	–	0	–	0
No. 13 Georgetown		–		8	–	2	–	0
Navy		–		6	–	2	–	1
Delaware		–		5	–	3	–	0
East Carolina		–		5	–	3	–	0
Western Maryland		–		5	–	3	–	0
George Washington		–		5	–	3	–	1
Catholic University		–		4	–	3	–	1
West Virginia		–		4	–	4	–	1
Virginia		–		4	–	5	–	0
Georgia Teachers		–		3	–	5	–	0
Roanoke		–		2	–	6	–	0
Oklahoma City		–		1	–	7	–	3
William & Mary Norfolk		–		0	–	6	–	0
Rankings from AP Poll

The 1940 Navy Midshipmen football team represented the United States Naval Academy during the 1940 college football season. In their second season under head coach Swede Larson, the Midshipmen compiled a 6–2–1 record and outscored their opponents by a combined score of 106 to 46.

Navy was ranked at No. 46 (out of 697 college football teams) in the final rankings under the Litkenhous Difference by Score system for 1940.

== Schedule ==
Date	Opponent	Rank	Site	Result	Attendance	Source
September 28	William & Mary		Thompson Stadium; Annapolis, MD	W 19–7	18,000	
October 5	Cincinnati		Thompson Stadium; Annapolis, MD	W 14–0		
October 12	at Princeton		Palmer Stadium; Princeton, NJ	W 12–6	40,000	
October 19	Drake		Thompson Stadium; Annapolis, MD	W 19–0		
October 26	at Yale*		Yale Bowl; New Haven, CT	W 21–0		
November 2	at No. 15 Penn	No. 14	Franklin Field; Philadelphia, PA	L 0–20	70,200	
November 9	No. 7 Notre Dame		Municipal Stadium; Baltimore, MD (rivalry)	L 7–13	61,579	
November 16	at Columbia		Baker Field; New York, NY	T 0–0	30,000	
November 30	vs. Army		Philadelphia Municipal Stadium; Philadelphia, PA (Army–Navy Game)	W 14–0	102,000	
*Non-conference game; Rankings from AP Poll released prior to the game

== Rankings ==
Ranking movements Legend: ██ Increase in ranking ██ Decrease in ranking — = Not ranked
	Week							
Poll	1	2	3	4	5	6	7	Final
AP	—	—	14	—	—	—	—	—
