= 1940 Case Rough Riders football team =

American college football season

1940 Case Rough Riders football
- Conference: Big Four Conference, Ohio Athletic Conference
- Record: 6–2 (2–1 Big Four, 3–0 OAC)
- Head coach: Ray A. Ride (11th season)
- Home stadium: Shaw Stadium

1940 Big Four Conference (Ohio) football standings
	Conf.					Overall
Team	W		L		T	W		L		T
Western Reserve $	3	–	0	–	0	8	–	1	–	0
Case	2	–	1	–	0	6	–	2	–	0
Baldwin–Wallace	1	–	2	–	0	4	–	4	–	0
John Carroll	0	–	3	–	0	2	–	6	–	0
$ – Conference champion

1940 Ohio Athletic Conference football standings
	Conf.					Overall
Team	W		L		T	W		L		T
Wittenberg $	7	–	0	–	0	8	–	0	–	0
Kent State	4	–	0	–	0	8	–	1	–	0
Case	3	–	0	–	0	6	–	2	–	0
Ohio Northern	5	–	3	–	0	5	–	3	–	0
Heidelberg	5	–	3	–	0	5	–	4	–	0
Capital	3	–	2	–	1	3	–	3	–	1
Denison	3	–	2	–	1	4	–	3	–	1
Wooster	3	–	2	–	1	4	–	3	–	1
Muskingum	3	–	2	–	0	5	–	2	–	1
Toledo	1	–	1	–	0	6	–	3	–	0
Baldwin–Wallace	2	–	2	–	0	4	–	4	–	0
Bowling Green	2	–	2	–	1	3	–	4	–	1
Kenyon	1	–	2	–	1	2	–	4	–	1
Findlay	1	–	2	–	0	4	–	4	–	0
Marietta	1	–	3	–	1	1	–	5	–	1
Otterbein	1	–	4	–	0	3	–	5	–	0
Oberlin	0	–	3	–	0	4	–	3	–	0
Ashland	0	–	3	–	0	1	–	4	–	1
John Carroll	0	–	3	–	0	2	–	6	–	0
Mount Union	0	–	6	–	0	0	–	8	–	1
$ – Conference champion

The 1940 Case Rough Riders football team represented the Case School of Applied Science—later merged into Case Western Reserve University—as a member of the Big Four Conference and the Ohio Athletic Conference (OAC) during the 1940 college football season. Led by 11th-year head coach Ray A. Ride, the Rough Riders compiling an overall record of 6–2. Case played second in the Big Four with a record of 2–1 and third in the OAC with a mark of 3–0. The team played home games at Shaw Stadium in Cleveland.

== Schedule ==
Date	Time	Opponent	Site	Result	Attendance	Source
September 28		Miami (OH)*	Miami Field; Oxford, OH	W 10–0		
October 5	2:00 p.m.	at Lehigh*	Shaw Stadium; Cleveland, OH	W 25–6	2,200	
October 12	2:00 p.m.	Wooster	Shaw Stadium; Cleveland, OH	W 7–0	4,000	
October 18	8:15 p.m.	John Carroll	Shaw Stadium; Cleveland, OH	W 31–12	7,300	
October 26	2:00 p.m.	at Carnegie Tech*	Pitt Stadium; Pittsburgh, PA	L 0–14	7,212	
November 2	2:00 p.m.	Baldwin–Wallace	Shaw Stadium; Cleveland, OH	W 20–0	5,600	
November 9	2:15 p.m.	Ohio Wesleyan*	Shaw Stadium; Cleveland, OH	W 18–10	3,000	
November 21	10:30 a.m.	at Western Reserve	League Park; Cleveland, OH	L 14–15	15,000	
*Non-conference game; All times are in Eastern time
