= 1940 Cincinnati Bearcats football team =

American college football season

1940 Cincinnati Bearcats football
- Conference: Independent
- Record: 5–3–1
- Head coach: Joseph A. Meyer (3rd season)
- Captain: Otto Oppenheimer
- Home stadium: Nippert Stadium

1940 Midwestern college football independents records
| | Conf. | | | Overall |
| Team | W | L | T | W | | L | | T |
|---|---|---|---|---|---|---|---|---|
| Michigan Tech | | – | | 5 | – | 1 | – | 0 |
| Detroit | | – | | 7 | – | 2 | – | 0 |
| Notre Dame | | – | | 7 | – | 2 | – | 0 |
| Xavier | | – | | 7 | – | 3 | – | 0 |
| Ohio | | – | | 5 | – | 2 | – | 2 |
| Wayne | | – | | 4 | – | 1 | – | 3 |
| Dayton | | – | | 6 | – | 3 | – | 0 |
| Cincinnati | | – | | 5 | – | 3 | – | 1 |
| Wichita | | – | | 6 | – | 4 | – | 0 |
| Central Michigan | | – | | 4 | – | 3 | – | 1 |
| Marquette | | – | | 4 | – | 4 | – | 0 |
| Michigan State | | – | | 3 | – | 4 | – | 1 |
| Ohio Wesleyan | | – | | 2 | – | 4 | – | 3 |
| Akron | | – | | 2 | – | 5 | – | 2 |
| Western State Teachers | | – | | 2 | – | 5 | – | 0 |
| Michigan State Normal | | – | | 1 | – | 5 | – | 1 |
| Miami (OH) | | – | | 0 | – | 7 | – | 1 |

The 1940 Cincinnati Bearcats football team was an American football team that represented the University of Cincinnati as an independent during the 1940 college football season. The Bearcats were led by head coach Joseph A. Meyer and compiled a 5–3–1 record.

Cincinnati was ranked at No. 112 (out of 697 college football teams) in the final rankings under the Litkenhous Difference by Score system for 1940.

== Schedule ==
| Date | Time | Opponent | Site | Result | Attendance | Source |
|---|---|---|---|---|---|---|
| September 1 | | Hanover | Nippert Stadium; Cincinnati, OH | W 45–0 | | |
| September 28 | | Louisville | Nippert Stadium; Cincinnati, OH (rivalry) | W 7–0 | | |
| October 5 | | at Navy | Thompson Stadium; Annapolis, MD | L 0–14 | | |
| October 12 | 8:30 p.m. | Centre | Nippert Stadium; Cincinnati, OH | W 22–0 | 12,000 | |
| October 19 | | at Boston University | Nickerson Field; Weston, MA | L 0–14 | | |
| October 26 | | Dayton | Nippert Stadium; Cincinnati, OH | L 0–7 | 12,500 | |
| November 2 | | Carnegie Tech^{†} | Nippert Stadium; Cincinnati, OH | W 7–6 | | |
| November 9 | | at West Virginia | Mountaineer Field; Morgantown, WV (rivalry) | T 7–7 | 10,000 | |
| November 21 | | Miami (OH) | Nippert Stadium; Cincinnati, OH (Victory Bell) | W 44–0 | 12,600 | |
^{†}Homecoming; All times are in Eastern time
