= 1940 George Washington Colonials football team =

American college football season

1940 George Washington Colonials football
- Conference: Independent
- Record: 5–3–1
- Head coach: Bill Reinhart (3rd season)
- Home stadium: Griffith Stadium

1940 Southern college football independents records
	Conf.			Overall
Team	W	L	T	W		L		T
No. 17 Hardin–Simmons		–		9	–	0	–	0
No. 13 Georgetown		–		8	–	2	–	0
Navy		–		6	–	2	–	1
Delaware		–		5	–	3	–	0
East Carolina		–		5	–	3	–	0
Western Maryland		–		5	–	3	–	0
George Washington		–		5	–	3	–	1
Catholic University		–		4	–	3	–	1
West Virginia		–		4	–	4	–	1
Virginia		–		4	–	5	–	0
Georgia Teachers		–		3	–	5	–	0
Roanoke		–		2	–	6	–	0
Oklahoma City		–		1	–	7	–	3
William & Mary Norfolk		–		0	–	6	–	0
Rankings from AP Poll

The 1940 George Washington Colonials football team was an American football team that represented George Washington University as an independent during the 1940 college football season. In its third season under head coach Bill Reinhart, the team compiled a 5–3–1 record and was outscored by a total of 82 to 78.

George Washington was ranked at No. 93 (out of 697 college football teams) in the final rankings under the Litkenhous Difference by Score system for 1940.

== Schedule ==
Date	Opponent	Site	Result	Attendance	Source
September 27	Mount St. Mary's	Griffith Stadium; Washington, DC	W 12–0		
October 4	at Manhattan	Polo Grounds; New York, NY	W 21–18	8,000	
October 12	at Washington and Lee	Wilson Field; Lexington, VA	W 20–14	5,000	
October 19	at Kentucky	Stoll Field; Lexington, KY	L 0–24	7,000	
October 25	West Virginia	Griffith Stadium; Washington, DC	W 19–0		
November 1	Wake Forest	Griffith Stadium; Washington, DC	L 0–18	10,000	
November 9	Bucknell	Griffith Stadium; Washington, DC	T 0–0	7,000	
November 16	Kansas	Griffith Stadium; Washington, DC	W 6–0		
November 23	vs. No. 9 Georgetown	Griffith Stadium; Washington, DC	L 0–8		
Rankings from AP Poll released prior to the game
