= 1940 Michigan State Spartans football team =

American college football season

1940 Michigan State Spartans football
- Conference: Independent
- Record: 3–4–1
- Head coach: Charlie Bachman (8th season)
- Offensive scheme: Notre Dame Box
- MVP: Jack Amon
- Captains: Jack Amon; Paul L. Griffeth
- Home stadium: Macklin Field

1940 Midwestern college football independents records
| | Conf. | | | Overall |
| Team | W | L | T | W | | L | | T |
|---|---|---|---|---|---|---|---|---|
| Michigan Tech | | – | | 5 | – | 1 | – | 0 |
| Detroit | | – | | 7 | – | 2 | – | 0 |
| Notre Dame | | – | | 7 | – | 2 | – | 0 |
| Xavier | | – | | 7 | – | 3 | – | 0 |
| Ohio | | – | | 5 | – | 2 | – | 2 |
| Wayne | | – | | 4 | – | 1 | – | 3 |
| Dayton | | – | | 6 | – | 3 | – | 0 |
| Cincinnati | | – | | 5 | – | 3 | – | 1 |
| Wichita | | – | | 6 | – | 4 | – | 0 |
| Central Michigan | | – | | 4 | – | 3 | – | 1 |
| Marquette | | – | | 4 | – | 4 | – | 0 |
| Michigan State | | – | | 3 | – | 4 | – | 1 |
| Ohio Wesleyan | | – | | 2 | – | 4 | – | 3 |
| Akron | | – | | 2 | – | 5 | – | 2 |
| Western State Teachers | | – | | 2 | – | 5 | – | 0 |
| Michigan State Normal | | – | | 1 | – | 5 | – | 1 |
| Miami (OH) | | – | | 0 | – | 7 | – | 1 |

The 1940 Michigan State Spartans football team represented Michigan State College as an independent during the 1940 college football season. In their eighth season under head coach Charlie Bachman, the Spartans compiled a 3–4–1 record and lost their annual rivalry game with Michigan by a 21 to 14 score. In inter-sectional play, the team lost to Temple (21–19) and Kansas State (32–0), played Santa Clara to a scoreless tie, and defeated West Virginia (17–0).

Ole Miss was ranked at No. 22 (out of 697 college football teams) in the final rankings under the Litkenhous Difference by Score system for 1940.

== Schedule ==
| Date | Opponent | Site | Result | Attendance | Source |
|---|---|---|---|---|---|
| October 5 | at Michigan | Michigan Stadium; Ann Arbor, MI (rivalry) | L 14–21 | 69,951 | |
| October 12 | Purdue | Macklin Field; East Lansing, MI | W 20–7 | 16,500 | |
| October 18 | at Temple | Temple Stadium; Philadelphia, PA | L 19–21 | 15,000 | |
| October 25 | Santa Clara^{†} | Macklin Field; East Lansing, MI | T 0–0 | 18,500 | |
| November 2 | Kansas State | Macklin Field; East Lansing, MI | W 32–0 | | |
| November 9 | at Indiana | Memorial Stadium; Bloomington, IN (rivalry) | L 0–20 | | |
| November 16 | at Marquette | Marquette Stadium; Milwaukee, WI | L 6–7 | 10,000 | |
| November 23 | West Virginia | Macklin Field; East Lansing, MI | W 17–0 | 9,500 | |
^{†}Homecoming

== Game summaries ==
=== Michigan ===
Week 2: Michigan State at Michigan

| Team | 1 | 2 | 3 | 4 | Total |
|---|---|---|---|---|---|
| Michigan State | 0 | 7 | 0 | 7 | 14 |
| • Michigan | 7 | 7 | 7 | 0 | 21 |

- Date: October 5, 1940
- Location: Michigan Stadium
  Ann Arbor, MI
- Game attendance: 69,951
- Referee: Lyle Clarno (Bradley)

On October 5, 1940, Michigan State lost to Michigan by a 21 to 14 score. The game was the 35th played between the two programs. Tom Harmon scored all 21 points for Michigan on three touchdowns and three kicks for extra point. Michigan gained 312 rushing yards compared to 49 rushing yards for Michigan State. Both Michigan State touchdowns were scored by right halfback Walt Pawlowski.
