= 1940 Oklahoma A&M Cowboys football team =

American college football season

1940 Oklahoma A&M Cowboys football
- Conference: Missouri Valley Conference
- Record: 6–3–1 (4–1 MVC)
- Head coach: Jim Lookabaugh (2nd season)
- Home stadium: Lewis Field

1940 Missouri Valley Conference football standings
	Conf.					Overall
Team	W		L		T	W		L		T
Tulsa $	4	–	0	–	0	7	–	3	–	0
Oklahoma A&M	4	–	1	–	0	6	–	3	–	1
Creighton	2	–	2	–	0	6	–	2	–	2
Drake	2	–	2	–	0	4	–	5	–	0
Saint Louis	2	–	3	–	0	3	–	6	–	0
Washington University	1	–	3	–	0	3	–	6	–	0
Washburn	0	–	4	–	0	4	–	6	–	0
$ – Conference champion

The 1940 Oklahoma A&M Cowboys football team represented Oklahoma A&M College in the 1940 college football season. This was the 40th year of football at A&M and the second under Jim Lookabaugh. The Cowboys played their home games at Lewis Field in Stillwater, Oklahoma. They finished the season 6–3–1, 4–1 in the Missouri Valley Conference.

Oklahoma A&M was ranked at No. 80 (out of 697 college football teams) in the final rankings under the Litkenhous Difference by Score system for 1940.

== Schedule ==
Date	Time	Opponent	Site	Result	Attendance	Source
September 20		Central State (OK)*	Lewis Field; Stillwater, OK	W 25–6		
September 27		vs. Texas Tech*	Taft Stadium; Oklahoma City, OK	T 6–6	9,000	
October 5		Oklahoma*	Lewis Field; Stillwater, OK (Bedlam Series)	L 27–29		
October 12		Wichita*	Lewis Field; Stillwater, OK	W 26–6	4,500	
October 19	2:30 p.m.	Washington University^{†}	Lewis Field; Stillwater, OK	W 53–12	7,000	
October 26		at Arizona*	Phoenix Union High School; Phoenix, AZ	L 0–24	9,000	
November 2		at Creighton	Creighton Stadium; Omaha, NE	W 20–14		
November 9		Washburn	Lewis Field; Stillwater, OK	W 33–14		
November 16		Saint Louis	Lewis Field; Stillwater, OK	W 14–7		
November 23		at Tulsa	Skelly Field; Tulsa, OK (rivalry)	L 6–19	8,500	
*Non-conference game; ^{†}Homecoming; All times are in Central time
