= John Shonk =

American football player (1918–1984)

No. 85
- Position: End

Personal information
- Born: April 30, 1918; Charleston, West Virginia, U.S.
- Died: April 26, 1984 (aged 65); Christiansburg, Virginia, U.S.
- Listed height: 6 ft 1 in (1.85 m)
- Listed weight: 190 lb (86 kg)

Career information
- High school: Charleston
- College: West Virginia
- NFL draft: 1941: 19th round, 171st overall pick

Career history
- Philadelphia Eagles (1941)

Career NFL statistics
- Receptions: 5
- Receiving yards: 52
- Return yards: 16
- Stats at Pro Football Reference

John J. Shonk III (April 30, 1918 – April 26, 1984) was an American professional football player who was a end for the Philadelphia Eagles of the National Football League (NFL) in 1941. He played college football for the West Virginia Mountaineers before he was selected by the Eagles in the 19th round (171st overall) of the 1941 NFL draft. He was team captain for West Virginia in 1940. He served in World War II for the United States Army.
