= Duncan Obee =

American football player (1918–1998)

Profile
- Position: Center

Personal information
- Born: July 9, 1918; Battle Creek, Michigan
- Died: November 27, 1998 (aged 80); Wood County, Ohio

Career information
- College: Dayton

Career history
- Detroit Lions (1941)

Duncan Francis "Dunc" Obee (July 9, 1918 - November 27, 1998) was an American football player.

Obee was born in 1918 in Battle Creek, Michigan. He attended Central Catholic High School in Toledo, Ohio. He then enrolled at the University of Dayton where he played college football as a center and linebacker for the Dayton Flyers football program from 1938 to 1940. He was selected as an all-Ohio center after the 1940 season. He also played one season for the Detroit Lions as a reserve center in 1941. He appeared in only three games for the Lions.

Obee's career with the Lions was cut short by the draft, as he was inducted into the United States Army in mid-October 1941. He served in the Army Air Forces during World War II. He graduated from bombardier school in San Angelo, Texas, received the rank of captain, and was assigned as an instructor at the air field in Childress, Texas.

Obee died in 1998 in Wood County, Ohio.
