= Al Ghesquiere =

American football player (1918–2012)

Profile
- Position: Halfback

Personal information
- Born: December 6, 1918; Detroit, Michigan, U.S.
- Died: October 16, 2012 (aged 93); Grosse Pointe, Michigan, U.S.

Career information
- College: University of Detroit

Career history
- 1938–1940: Detroit

Awards and highlights
- NCAA rushing leader, 1940

Albert William Ghesquiere (December 6, 1918 – October 16, 2012), nicknamed "the Crazy Buffalo", was an American football player. He led the NCAA in rushing in 1940 with 956 yards in nine games.

== Early life ==
Ghesquiere was born in Detroit, Michigan, and grew up in Grosse Pointe, Michigan, and attended St. Paul High School in Grosse Pointe.

== University of Detroit ==
He attended the University of Detroit on a basketball scholarship. After seeing Ghesquiere playing with the university's freshman team in the fall of 1939, Detroit Titans football coach Gus Dorais (who was also the university's athletic director) arranged for him to play football instead of basketball. Ghesquiere played for Dorais' Titans from 1938 to 1940. He was the team's leading scorer in both 1938 and 1940. He also led the NCAA with 958 rushing yards during the 1940 season, 113 yards more than 1940 Heisman Trophy winner, Tom Harmon. He averaged 6.6 yards per carry in 1940, which ranked third best among major college players that year. He was a triple-threat man who also passed for 285 yards in 1940 for a combined total of 1,242 rushing and passing yards.

== Later life ==
Ghesquiere was selected by the Philadelphia Eagles in the fourth round with the 26th pick in the 1941 NFL draft, but he turned down an offer of $1,200 per year and chose not to play professional football. Instead, Ghesquiere worked for more than 40 years for Uniroyal Tire Company. In 1981, he was inducted into the Detroit Titans Hall of Fame. He died in October 2012 in Grosse Pointe, Michigan, at age 93.

== See also ==
- List of college football yearly rushing leaders
