= John Christenbury =

American sports coach

- Christenbury pictured in The Tecoan 1942, East Carolina yearbook

Biographical details
- Born: February 13, 1907; Statesville, North Carolina, U.S.
- Died: July 17, 1944 (aged 37); Port Chicago, California, U.S.

Coaching career (HC unless noted)

Football
- 1938–1939: Brevard
- 1940–1941: East Carolina

Basketball
- 1940–1943: East Carolina

Baseball
- 1941–1942: East Carolina

Head coaching record
- Overall: 20–9–2 (football); 25–15 (basketball); 13–11 (baseball)

John Boyd Christenbury (February 13, 1907 – July 17, 1944) was an American college football, basketball and baseball coach. His collegiate career began in 1938 when he became athletic director at Brevard College, serving there until 1940. While at Brevard, Christenbury also served as head football coach in 1938 and 1939. In 1940, he moved to East Carolina Teachers College, now East Carolina University, where he assumed the role of head coach for men's football and basketball in 1940 and baseball in 1941. Christenbury's 1941 football team went 7–0 and recorded the only undefeated season in East Carolina history. He did not coach football in 1942 due to the outbreak of World War II, although he continued coaching baseball through the 1942 season and basketball until early 1943.

Christenbury enlisted in the United States Navy in 1943. On July 17, 1944 he was killed along with 319 others when munitions exploded during the loading of a ship in Port Chicago, California. On January 6, 1953 the Christenbury Memorial Gymnasium was named in his honor. He was inducted into the East Carolina Hall of Fame in 1993.

== Head coaching record ==
=== Football ===
The following is a table of Christenbury's yearly records as a head football coach.

| Year | Team | Overall | Conference | Standing | Bowl/playoffs |
|---|---|---|---|---|---|
Brevard Tornados (North Carolina Junior College Conference) (1938–1939)
| 1938 | Brevard | 5–5 | | | |
| 1939 | Brevard | 3–1–2 | | | |
| Brevard: | | 8–6–2 (.563) | | | |
East Carolina Pirates (Independent) (1940–1941)
| 1940 | East Carolina | 5–3 | | | |
| 1941 | East Carolina | 7–0 | | | |
| East Carolina: | | 12–3 (.800) | | | |
| Total: | | 20–9–2 (.677) | | | |

=== Basketball ===
The following is a table of Christenbury's yearly records as a head basketball coach.

Record table
| Season | Team | Overall | Conference | Standing | Postseason |
|---|---|---|---|---|---|
East Carolina Pirates (Independent) (1940–1943)
| 1940–41 | East Carolina | 15–4 | | | |
| 1941–42 | East Carolina | 9–9 | | | |
| 1942–43 | East Carolina | 1–2 | | | |
| East Carolina: | | 25–15 (.625) | | | |
| Total: | | 25–15 (.625) | | | |

=== Baseball ===
The following is a table of Christenbury's yearly records as a head baseball coach.

Record table
| Season | Team | Overall | Conference | Standing | Postseason |
|---|---|---|---|---|---|
East Carolina Pirates (Independent) (1941–1942)
| 1941 | East Carolina | 6–4 | | | |
| 1942 | East Carolina | 7–7 | | | |
| East Carolina: | | 13–11 (.542) | | | |
| Total: | | 13–11 (.542) | | | |
