= 1941 Tampa Spartans football team =

American college football season

1941 Tampa Spartans football
- Conference: Southern Intercollegiate Athletic Association
- Record: 5–4 (2–2 SIAA)
- Head coach: Flucie Stewart (1st season)
- Home stadium: Phillips Field

1941 Southern Intercollegiate Athletic Association football standings
| | Conf. | | | | | Overall |
| Team | W | | L | | T | W | | L | | T |
|---|---|---|---|---|---|---|---|---|---|---|
| Presbyterian $ | 5 | – | 0 | – | 0 | 6 | – | 3 | – | 0 |
| Miami (FL) | 2 | – | 0 | – | 0 | 8 | – | 2 | – | 0 |
| Centre | 2 | – | 0 | – | 0 | 3 | – | 4 | – | 0 |
| Mississippi Southern | 6 | – | 0 | – | 1 | 9 | – | 0 | – | 1 |
| Louisiana Tech | 5 | – | 1 | – | 0 | 5 | – | 4 | – | 1 |
| Eastern Kentucky | 3 | – | 1 | – | 0 | 7 | – | 1 | – | 0 |
| SW Louisiana | 3 | – | 1 | – | 1 | 6 | – | 2 | – | 1 |
| Union (TN) | 3 | – | 1 | – | 1 | 5 | – | 3 | – | 1 |
| Tennessee Tech | 3 | – | 1 | – | 0 | 5 | – | 4 | – | 0 |
| Western Kentucky State Teachers | 3 | – | 1 | – | 1 | 4 | – | 5 | – | 1 |
| Georgetown (KY) | 2 | – | 1 | – | 0 | 7 | – | 2 | – | 0 |
| Wofford | 2 | – | 1 | – | 0 | 4 | – | 6 | – | 0 |
| Memphis State | 3 | – | 2 | – | 0 | 6 | – | 3 | – | 0 |
| Rollins | 2 | – | 2 | – | 0 | 5 | – | 2 | – | 1 |
| Louisiana Normal | 3 | – | 3 | – | 1 | 4 | – | 3 | – | 1 |
| Murray State | 3 | – | 3 | – | 2 | 4 | – | 3 | – | 2 |
| Tampa | 2 | – | 2 | – | 0 | 5 | – | 4 | – | 0 |
| Louisville | 1 | – | 1 | – | 0 | 4 | – | 4 | – | 0 |
| Middle Tennessee State Teachers | 2 | – | 3 | – | 1 | 4 | – | 3 | – | 1 |
| Newberry | 2 | – | 3 | – | 0 | 5 | – | 6 | – | 0 |
| Mississippi College | 1 | – | 2 | – | 0 | 5 | – | 3 | – | 0 |
| SE Louisiana | 2 | – | 4 | – | 0 | 3 | – | 6 | – | 0 |
| Oglethorpe | 1 | – | 3 | – | 0 | 3 | – | 3 | – | 0 |
| Transylvania | 1 | – | 3 | – | 0 | 3 | – | 5 | – | 0 |
| Troy State | 1 | – | 4 | – | 0 | 5 | – | 4 | – | 0 |
| Southeastern Louisiana | 0 | – | 3 | – | 0 | 3 | – | 6 | – | 1 |
| Louisiana College | 1 | – | 5 | – | 0 | 4 | – | 7 | – | 0 |
| Delta State | 1 | – | 7 | – | 1 | 1 | – | 8 | – | 1 |
| Centenary | 0 | – | 1 | – | 1 | 0 | – | 8 | – | 2 |
| Union (KY) | 0 | – | 1 | – | 0 | 0 | – | 5 | – | 0 |
| Morehead State | 0 | – | 3 | – | 0 | 3 | – | 4 | – | 0 |
| Erskine | 0 | – | 4 | – | 0 | 2 | – | 5 | – | 0 |
$ – Conference champion

The 1941 Tampa Spartans football team was an American football team that represented the University of Tampa as a member of the Southern Intercollegiate Athletic Association (SIAA) during the 1941 college football season. In their first year under head coach Flucie Stewart, the Spartans compiled an overall record of 5–4 with a mark of 2–2 in conference play. The team played home games at Phillips Field in Tampa, Florida.

Tampa was ranked at No. 219 (out of 681 teams) in the final rankings under the Litkenhous Difference by Score System for 1941.

== Schedule ==
| Date | Time | Opponent | Site | Result | Attendance | Source |
|---|---|---|---|---|---|---|
| September 19 | | Troy State | Phillips Field; Tampa, FL | W 26–0 | | |
| September 26 | | South Georgia* | Phillips Field; Tampa, FL | W 44–0 | 4,500 | |
| October 4 | | at Florida* | Florida Field; Gainesville, FL | L 6–46 | | |
| October 10 | 8:00 p.m. | Miami (FL) | Phillips Field; Tampa, FL | L 6–20 | 7,500 | |
| October 17 | | Erskine | Phillips Field; Tampa, FL | W 37–0 | | |
| November 1 | | at Howard (AL)* | Legion Field; Birmingham, AL | L 13–16 | | |
| November 7 | | Appalachian State* | Phillips Field; Tampa, FL | W 10–6 | | |
| November 14 | | Rollins | Phillips Field; Tampa, FL | L 6–13 | 6,000 | |
| November 21 | | MacDill Air Force Base* | Phillips Field; Tampa, FL | W 67–2 | 2,500 | |
*Non-conference game; All times are in Eastern time
