= 1941 Troy State Red Wave football team =

American college football season

1941 Troy State Red Wave football

AIC champion
- Conference: Alabama Intercollegiate Conference, Southern Intercollegiate Athletic Association
- Record: 5–4 (3–0 AIC, 1–4 SIAA)
- Head coach: Albert Choate (5th season)
- Home stadium: Pace Field

1941 Southern Intercollegiate Athletic Association football standings
	Conf.					Overall
Team	W		L		T	W		L		T
Presbyterian $	5	–	0	–	0	6	–	3	–	0
Miami (FL)	2	–	0	–	0	8	–	2	–	0
Centre	2	–	0	–	0	3	–	4	–	0
Mississippi Southern	6	–	0	–	1	9	–	0	–	1
Louisiana Tech	5	–	1	–	0	5	–	4	–	1
Eastern Kentucky	3	–	1	–	0	7	–	1	–	0
SW Louisiana	3	–	1	–	1	6	–	2	–	1
Union (TN)	3	–	1	–	1	5	–	3	–	1
Tennessee Tech	3	–	1	–	0	5	–	4	–	0
Western Kentucky State Teachers	3	–	1	–	1	4	–	5	–	1
Georgetown (KY)	2	–	1	–	0	7	–	2	–	0
Wofford	2	–	1	–	0	4	–	6	–	0
Memphis State	3	–	2	–	0	6	–	3	–	0
Rollins	2	–	2	–	0	5	–	2	–	1
Louisiana Normal	3	–	3	–	1	4	–	3	–	1
Murray State	3	–	3	–	2	4	–	3	–	2
Tampa	2	–	2	–	0	5	–	4	–	0
Louisville	1	–	1	–	0	4	–	4	–	0
Middle Tennessee State Teachers	2	–	3	–	1	4	–	3	–	1
Newberry	2	–	3	–	0	5	–	6	–	0
Mississippi College	1	–	2	–	0	5	–	3	–	0
SE Louisiana	2	–	4	–	0	3	–	6	–	0
Oglethorpe	1	–	3	–	0	3	–	3	–	0
Transylvania	1	–	3	–	0	3	–	5	–	0
Troy State	1	–	4	–	0	5	–	4	–	0
Southeastern Louisiana	0	–	3	–	0	3	–	6	–	1
Louisiana College	1	–	5	–	0	4	–	7	–	0
Delta State	1	–	7	–	1	1	–	8	–	1
Centenary	0	–	1	–	1	0	–	8	–	2
Union (KY)	0	–	1	–	0	0	–	5	–	0
Morehead State	0	–	3	–	0	3	–	4	–	0
Erskine	0	–	4	–	0	2	–	5	–	0
$ – Conference champion

The 1941 Troy State Red Wave football team represented Troy State Teachers College (now known as Troy University) as a member of the Alabama Intercollegiate Conference (AIC) during the 1941 college football season. Led by fifth-year head coach Albert Choate, the Red Wave compiled an overall record of 5–4, with a mark of 3–0 in AIC play, winning the conference title. Troy State had a record of 1–4 against SIAA opponents, placing 25th.

== Schedule ==
Date	Opponent	Site	Result	Attendance	Source
September 19	at Tampa	Phillips Field; Tampa, FL	L 0–26		
September 26	at Delta State	Delta Field; Cleveland, MS	L 0–25		
October 10	at Oglethorpe	Hermance Stadium; North Atlanta, GA	W 3–0		
October 17	Georgia Teachers*	Pace Field; Troy, AL	W 25–0		
October 25	Marion	Pace Field; Troy, AL	W 19–0		
November 8	Livingston State	Pace Field; Troy, AL	W 41–14		
November 15	at Memphis State	Crump Stadium; Memphis, TN	L 0–32		
November 20	St. Bernard	Pace Field; Troy, AL	W 20–0	600	
November 28	Oglethorpe	Wiregrass Memorial Stadium; Dothan, AL	L 0–21		
*Non-conference game
