= 1941 Louisville Cardinals football team =

American college football season

1941 Louisville Cardinals football
- Conference: Southern Intercollegiate Athletic Association
- Record: 4–4 (1–1 SIAA)
- Head coach: Laurie Apitz (6th season)
- Home stadium: Maxwell Field, duPont Manual Stadium

1941 Southern Intercollegiate Athletic Association football standings
	Conf.					Overall
Team	W		L		T	W		L		T
Presbyterian $	5	–	0	–	0	6	–	3	–	0
Miami (FL)	2	–	0	–	0	8	–	2	–	0
Centre	2	–	0	–	0	3	–	4	–	0
Mississippi Southern	6	–	0	–	1	9	–	0	–	1
Louisiana Tech	5	–	1	–	0	5	–	4	–	1
Eastern Kentucky	3	–	1	–	0	7	–	1	–	0
SW Louisiana	3	–	1	–	1	6	–	2	–	1
Union (TN)	3	–	1	–	1	5	–	3	–	1
Tennessee Tech	3	–	1	–	0	5	–	4	–	0
Western Kentucky State Teachers	3	–	1	–	1	4	–	5	–	1
Georgetown (KY)	2	–	1	–	0	7	–	2	–	0
Wofford	2	–	1	–	0	4	–	6	–	0
Memphis State	3	–	2	–	0	6	–	3	–	0
Rollins	2	–	2	–	0	5	–	2	–	1
Louisiana Normal	3	–	3	–	1	4	–	3	–	1
Murray State	3	–	3	–	2	4	–	3	–	2
Tampa	2	–	2	–	0	5	–	4	–	0
Louisville	1	–	1	–	0	4	–	4	–	0
Middle Tennessee State Teachers	2	–	3	–	1	4	–	3	–	1
Newberry	2	–	3	–	0	5	–	6	–	0
Mississippi College	1	–	2	–	0	5	–	3	–	0
SE Louisiana	2	–	4	–	0	3	–	6	–	0
Oglethorpe	1	–	3	–	0	3	–	3	–	0
Transylvania	1	–	3	–	0	3	–	5	–	0
Troy State	1	–	4	–	0	5	–	4	–	0
Southeastern Louisiana	0	–	3	–	0	3	–	6	–	1
Louisiana College	1	–	5	–	0	4	–	7	–	0
Delta State	1	–	7	–	1	1	–	8	–	1
Centenary	0	–	1	–	1	0	–	8	–	2
Union (KY)	0	–	1	–	0	0	–	5	–	0
Morehead State	0	–	3	–	0	3	–	4	–	0
Erskine	0	–	4	–	0	2	–	5	–	0
$ – Conference champion

The 1941 Louisville Cardinals football team was an American football team that represented the University of Louisville as a member of the Southern Intercollegiate Athletic Association (SIAA) during the 1941 college football season. In their sixth season under head coach Laurie Apitz, the Cardinals compiled a 4–4 record and outscored opponents by a combined total of 143 to 140.

== Schedule ==
Date	Time	Opponent	Site	Result	Attendance	Source
September 22		Rio Grande*	Maxwell Field; Louisville, KY	W 58–0		
September 27		at Cincinnati*	Nippert Stadium; Cincinnati, OH (rivalry)	L 7–28	9,000	
October 4		Evansville*	Maxwell Field; Louisville, KY	W 31–6		
October 17		Transylvania	Thomas Field; Louisville, KY	W 13–0	2,500	
October 23		Georgetown (KY)	Maxwell Field; Louisville, KY	L 7–19	4,500	
November 1		at DePauw*	Blackstock Memorial Stadium; Greencastle, IN	L 6–13		
November 8		at Hanover*	Hanover, IN	W 21–6		
November 15	2:00 p.m.	Vanderbilt*	duPont Manual Stadium; Louisville, KY	L 0–68	4,000	
*Non-conference game; All times are in Central time
