= 1941 Rollins Tars football team =

American college football season

1941 Rollins Tars football
- Conference: Southern Intercollegiate Athletic Association
- Record: 5–2–1 (2–2 SIAA)
- Head coach: Jack McDowall (13th season)
- Home stadium: Greater Orlando Stadium

1941 Southern Intercollegiate Athletic Association football standings
	Conf.					Overall
Team	W		L		T	W		L		T
Presbyterian $	5	–	0	–	0	6	–	3	–	0
Miami (FL)	2	–	0	–	0	8	–	2	–	0
Centre	2	–	0	–	0	3	–	4	–	0
Mississippi Southern	6	–	0	–	1	9	–	0	–	1
Louisiana Tech	5	–	1	–	0	5	–	4	–	1
Eastern Kentucky	3	–	1	–	0	7	–	1	–	0
SW Louisiana	3	–	1	–	1	6	–	2	–	1
Union (TN)	3	–	1	–	1	5	–	3	–	1
Tennessee Tech	3	–	1	–	0	5	–	4	–	0
Western Kentucky State Teachers	3	–	1	–	1	4	–	5	–	1
Georgetown (KY)	2	–	1	–	0	7	–	2	–	0
Wofford	2	–	1	–	0	4	–	6	–	0
Memphis State	3	–	2	–	0	6	–	3	–	0
Rollins	2	–	2	–	0	5	–	2	–	1
Louisiana Normal	3	–	3	–	1	4	–	3	–	1
Murray State	3	–	3	–	2	4	–	3	–	2
Tampa	2	–	2	–	0	5	–	4	–	0
Louisville	1	–	1	–	0	4	–	4	–	0
Middle Tennessee State Teachers	2	–	3	–	1	4	–	3	–	1
Newberry	2	–	3	–	0	5	–	6	–	0
Mississippi College	1	–	2	–	0	5	–	3	–	0
SE Louisiana	2	–	4	–	0	3	–	6	–	0
Oglethorpe	1	–	3	–	0	3	–	3	–	0
Transylvania	1	–	3	–	0	3	–	5	–	0
Troy State	1	–	4	–	0	5	–	4	–	0
Southeastern Louisiana	0	–	3	–	0	3	–	6	–	1
Louisiana College	1	–	5	–	0	4	–	7	–	0
Delta State	1	–	7	–	1	1	–	8	–	1
Centenary	0	–	1	–	1	0	–	8	–	2
Union (KY)	0	–	1	–	0	0	–	5	–	0
Morehead State	0	–	3	–	0	3	–	4	–	0
Erskine	0	–	4	–	0	2	–	5	–	0
$ – Conference champion

The 1941 Rollins Tars football team was an American football team that represented Rollins College as a member of the Southern Intercollegiate Athletic Association (SIAA) during the 1941 college football season. In their 13th season under head coach Jack McDowall, the Tars compiled a 5–2–1 record (2–2 against SIAA opponents), shut out five of eight opponents, and outscored all opponents by a total of 164 to 41.

Rollins guard Frank Grundler was selected by the Associated Press as a first-team player on the 1941 All-Florida football team. End Scott and back Ray received second-team honors.

Rollins was ranked at No. 83 (out of 681 teams) in the final rankings under the Litkenhous Difference by Score System for 1941.

The team played its home games at Greater Orlando Stadium in Orlando, Florida.

== Schedule ==
Date	Opponent	Site	Result	Attendance	Source
September 20	at Davidson*	Richardson Stadium; Davidson, NC	T 0–0		
September 26	at Newberry	Newberry Municipal Stadium; Newberry, SC	W 40–0		
October 17	at Miami (FL)	Burdine Stadium; Miami, FL	L 0–21	18,000	
October 24	Mercer*	Greater Orlando Stadium; Orlando, FL	W 52–0	3,000	
November 7	Davis & Elkins*	Greater Orlando Stadium; Orlando, FL	W 25–0	3,000	
November 14	at Tampa	Phillips Field; Tampa, FL	W 13–6	6,000	
November 21	Presbyterian	Greater Orlando Stadium; Orlando, FL	L 6–14		
November 28	Howard (AL)*	Greater Orlando Stadium; Orlando, FL	W 28–0	3,500	
*Non-conference game
