= 1941 Miami Hurricanes football team =

American college football season

1941 Miami Hurricanes football
- Conference: Southern Intercollegiate Athletic Association
- Record: 8–2 (2–0 SIAA)
- Head coach: Jack Harding (5th season)
- Home stadium: Burdine Stadium

1941 Southern Intercollegiate Athletic Association football standings
	Conf.					Overall
Team	W		L		T	W		L		T
Presbyterian $	5	–	0	–	0	6	–	3	–	0
Miami (FL)	2	–	0	–	0	8	–	2	–	0
Centre	2	–	0	–	0	3	–	4	–	0
Mississippi Southern	6	–	0	–	1	9	–	0	–	1
Louisiana Tech	5	–	1	–	0	5	–	4	–	1
Eastern Kentucky	3	–	1	–	0	7	–	1	–	0
SW Louisiana	3	–	1	–	1	6	–	2	–	1
Union (TN)	3	–	1	–	1	5	–	3	–	1
Tennessee Tech	3	–	1	–	0	5	–	4	–	0
Western Kentucky State Teachers	3	–	1	–	1	4	–	5	–	1
Georgetown (KY)	2	–	1	–	0	7	–	2	–	0
Wofford	2	–	1	–	0	4	–	6	–	0
Memphis State	3	–	2	–	0	6	–	3	–	0
Rollins	2	–	2	–	0	5	–	2	–	1
Louisiana Normal	3	–	3	–	1	4	–	3	–	1
Murray State	3	–	3	–	2	4	–	3	–	2
Tampa	2	–	2	–	0	5	–	4	–	0
Louisville	1	–	1	–	0	4	–	4	–	0
Middle Tennessee State Teachers	2	–	3	–	1	4	–	3	–	1
Newberry	2	–	3	–	0	5	–	6	–	0
Mississippi College	1	–	2	–	0	5	–	3	–	0
SE Louisiana	2	–	4	–	0	3	–	6	–	0
Oglethorpe	1	–	3	–	0	3	–	3	–	0
Transylvania	1	–	3	–	0	3	–	5	–	0
Troy State	1	–	4	–	0	5	–	4	–	0
Southeastern Louisiana	0	–	3	–	0	3	–	6	–	1
Louisiana College	1	–	5	–	0	4	–	7	–	0
Delta State	1	–	7	–	1	1	–	8	–	1
Centenary	0	–	1	–	1	0	–	8	–	2
Union (KY)	0	–	1	–	0	0	–	5	–	0
Morehead State	0	–	3	–	0	3	–	4	–	0
Erskine	0	–	4	–	0	2	–	5	–	0
$ – Conference champion

The 1941 Miami Hurricanes football team was an American football team that represented the University of Miami as a member of the Southern Intercollegiate Athletic Association (SIAA) in the 1941 college football season. In their fifth season under head coach Jack Harding, the Hurricanes compiled an 8–2 record and outscored opponents by a total of 162 to 54. The team's victories included games against Texas Tech (6–0), South Carolina (7–6), and VMI (10–7); its losses were to Florida (14–0) and Alabama (21–7).

Key players included halfback Russell Coates.

Miami was ranked at No. 63 (out of 681 teams) in the final rankings under the Litkenhous Difference by Score System for 1941.

The Hurricanes played nine of their ten games at Burdine Stadium in Miami, Florida. The Florida–Miami football rivalry game was played on a Saturday night, and the other home games were played on Friday nights.

== Schedule ==
Date	Time	Opponent	Site	Result	Attendance	Source
October 3		Elon*	Burdine Stadium; Miami, FL	W 38–0	16,000	
October 10	8:00 pm	at Tampa	Phillips Field; Tampa, FL	W 20–6	7,500	
October 17		Rollins	Burdine Stadium; Miami, FL	W 21–0	18,000	
October 24		Howard (AL)*	Burdine Stadium; Miami, FL	W 19–0	12,000	
October 31		Texas Tech*	Burdine Stadium; Miami, FL	W 6–0	25,000	
November 7		West Virginia Wesleyan*	Burdine Stadium; Miami, FL	W 34–0	19,284	
November 15		Florida*	Burdine Stadium; Miami, FL (rivalry)	L 0–14	31,731	
November 21		South Carolina*	Burdine Stadium; Miami, FL	W 7–6	17,210	
November 28	8:15 pm	No. 18 Alabama*	Burdine Stadium; Miami, FL	L 7–21	26,000	
December 5		VMI*	Burdine Stadium; Miami, FL	W 10–7	19,544	
*Non-conference game; Rankings from AP Poll released prior to the game; All times are in Eastern time
