= 1948 North Texas State Teachers Eagles football team =

American college football season

1948 North Texas State Teachers Eagles football
- Conference: Lone Star Conference
- Record: 6–4 (4–2 LSC)
- Head coach: Odus Mitchell (3rd season)
- Home stadium: Eagle Field

1948 Lone Star Conference football standings
| | Conf. | | | | | Overall |
| Team | W | | L | | T | W | | L | | T |
|---|---|---|---|---|---|---|---|---|---|---|
| Southwest Texas State $ | 6 | – | 0 | – | 0 | 8 | – | 1 | – | 0 |
| North Texas State | 4 | – | 2 | – | 0 | 6 | – | 4 | – | 0 |
| Stephen F. Austin | 3 | – | 2 | – | 1 | 7 | – | 2 | – | 1 |
| Trinity (TX) | 2 | – | 2 | – | 2 | 6 | – | 2 | – | 2 |
| Houston | 3 | – | 3 | – | 0 | 5 | – | 6 | – | 0 |
| East Texas State | 1 | – | 4 | – | 1 | 3 | – | 6 | – | 1 |
| Sam Houston State | 0 | – | 6 | – | 0 | 0 | – | 9 | – | 1 |
$ – Conference champion

The 1948 North Texas State Teachers Eagles football team was an American football team that represented the North Texas State Teachers College (now known as the University of North Texas) during the 1948 college football season as a member of the Lone Star Conference. In their third year under head coach Odus Mitchell, the team compiled a 6–4 record.

North Texas was ranked at No. 119 in the final Litkenhous Difference by Score System ratings for 1948.

== Schedule ==
| Date | Opponent | Site | Result | Attendance | Source |
|---|---|---|---|---|---|
| September 17 | at Oklahoma City* | Taft Stadium; Oklahoma City, OK | L 6–14 | | |
| September 25 | Randolph Field* | Eagle Field; Denton, TX | W 86–0 | | |
| October 2 | at West Texas State* | Buffalo Stadium; Canyon, TX | W 20–7 | | |
| October 9 | at No. 19 Nevada* | Mackay Stadium; Reno, NV | L 7–48 | 8,600 | |
| October 16 | at Stephen F. Austin | Nacogdoches, TX | W 19–6 | 6,200 | |
| October 23 | Sam Houston State | Eagle Field; Denton, TX | W 37–7 | | |
| October 30 | at Southwest Texas State | Evans Field; San Marcos, TX | L 14–24 | | |
| November 6 | Trinity (TX) | Eagle Field; Denton, TX | W 27–12 | 7,000 | |
| November 13 | at Houston | Public School Stadium; Houston, TX | L 6–8 | 3,000 | |
| November 20 | East Texas State^{†} | Eagle Field; Denton, TX | W 27–7 | 9,500 | |
*Non-conference game; ^{†}Homecoming; Rankings from AP Poll released prior to the game
