= 1949 Southwestern Louisiana Bulldogs football team =

American college football season

1949 Southwestern Louisiana Bulldogs football
- Conference: Gulf States Conference
- Record: 6–3 (3–2 GSC)
- Head coach: Gee Mitchell (3rd season)
- Home stadium: McNaspy Stadium

1949 Gulf States Conference football standings
	Conf.					Overall
Team	W		L		T	W		L		T
Louisiana Tech $	5	–	0	–	0	7	–	2	–	0
Mississippi Southern	2	–	1	–	0	7	–	3	–	0
Southwestern Louisiana	3	–	2	–	0	6	–	3	–	0
Southeastern Louisiana	1	–	2	–	1	4	–	5	–	1
Northwestern State	1	–	4	–	0	5	–	4	–	0
Louisiana College	0	–	3	–	1	4	–	6	–	1
$ – Conference champion

The 1949 Southwestern Louisiana Bulldogs football team was an American football team that represented the Southwestern Louisiana Institute of Liberal and Technical Learning (now known as the University of Louisiana at Lafayette) in the Gulf States Conference during the 1949 college football season. In their third year under head coach Gee Mitchell, the team compiled a 6–3 record.

== Schedule ==
Date	Opponent	Site	Result	Source
September 17	Austin*	McNaspy Stadium; Lafayette, LA	W 30–0	
September 24	Troy State*	McNaspy Stadium; Lafayette, LA	W 48–25	
October 1	at Southeastern Louisiana	Strawberry Stadium; Hammond, LA (rivalry)	W 27–20	
October 8	Houston*	McNaspy Stadium; Lafayette, LA	L 7–28	
October 15	Mississippi Southern	McNaspy Stadium; Lafayette, LA	L 0–25	
October 22	Louisiana College	McNaspy Stadium; Lafayette, LA	W 7–0	
October 29	at Louisiana Tech	Tech Stadium; Ruston, LA (rivalry)	L 0–21	
November 12	at Pensacola NAS*	Pensacola, FL	W 28–12	
November 19	Northwestern State^{†}	McNaspy Stadium; Lafayette, LA	W 27–14	
*Non-conference game; ^{†}Homecoming
