= 1947 Southwestern Louisiana Bulldogs football team =

American college football season

1947 Southwestern Louisiana Bulldogs football
- Conference: Louisiana Intercollegiate Conference
- Record: 6–2 (4–1 LIC)
- Head coach: Gee Mitchell (1st season)
- Home stadium: McNaspy Stadium

1947 Louisiana Intercollegiate Conference football standings
	Conf.					Overall
Team	W		L		T	W		L		T
Louisiana Tech $	5	–	0	–	0	5	–	4	–	0
Southwestern Louisiana	4	–	1	–	0	6	–	2	–	0
Northwestern State	3	–	2	–	0	4	–	5	–	0
Southeastern Louisiana	2	–	3	–	0	3	–	5	–	1
Centenary	1	–	4	–	0	1	–	9	–	1
Louisiana College	0	–	4	–	0	1	–	5	–	1
$ – Conference champion

The 1947 Southwestern Louisiana Bulldogs football team was an American football team that represented the Southwestern Louisiana Institute of Liberal and Technical Learning (now known as the University of Louisiana at Lafayette) in the Louisiana Intercollegiate Conference during the 1947 college football season. In their first year under head coach Gee Mitchell, the team compiled a 6–2 record.

In the final Litkenhous Ratings released in mid-December, Southwestern Louisiana was ranked at No. 177 out of 500 college football teams.

== Schedule ==
Date	Opponent	Site	Result	Attendance	Source
September 27	at Stephen F. Austin*	Memorial Stadium; Nacogdoches, TX	W 24–6		
October 4	Southeastern Louisiana	McNaspy Stadium; Lafayette, LA (rivalry)	W 40–7	10,000	
October 11	Livingston State*	McNaspy Stadium; Lafayette, LA	W 26–0		
October 18	Mississippi Southern*	McNaspy Stadium; Lafayette, LA	L 7–15		
October 25	Louisiana College^{†}	McNaspy Stadium; Lafayette, LA	W 38–7	9,000	
November 1	at Louisiana Tech	Tech Stadium; Ruston, LA (rivalry)	L 0–9		
November 8	at Centenary	Fairgrounds Stadium; Shreveport, LA	W 21–7		
November 27	Northwestern State	McNaspy Stadium; Lafayette, LA	W 9–7		
*Non-conference game; ^{†}Homecoming
