= 1941 Memphis State Tigers football team =

American college football season

1941 Memphis State Tigers football
- Conference: Southern Intercollegiate Athletic Association
- Record: 6–3 (3–2 SIAA)
- Head coach: Cecil C. Humphreys (3rd season)
- Captains: Lewis Glass; Kenny Barker
- Home stadium: Crump Stadium

1941 Southern Intercollegiate Athletic Association football standings
	Conf.					Overall
Team	W		L		T	W		L		T
Presbyterian $	5	–	0	–	0	6	–	3	–	0
Miami (FL)	2	–	0	–	0	8	–	2	–	0
Centre	2	–	0	–	0	3	–	4	–	0
Mississippi Southern	6	–	0	–	1	9	–	0	–	1
Louisiana Tech	5	–	1	–	0	5	–	4	–	1
Eastern Kentucky	3	–	1	–	0	7	–	1	–	0
SW Louisiana	3	–	1	–	1	6	–	2	–	1
Union (TN)	3	–	1	–	1	5	–	3	–	1
Tennessee Tech	3	–	1	–	0	5	–	4	–	0
Western Kentucky State Teachers	3	–	1	–	1	4	–	5	–	1
Georgetown (KY)	2	–	1	–	0	7	–	2	–	0
Wofford	2	–	1	–	0	4	–	6	–	0
Memphis State	3	–	2	–	0	6	–	3	–	0
Rollins	2	–	2	–	0	5	–	2	–	1
Louisiana Normal	3	–	3	–	1	4	–	3	–	1
Murray State	3	–	3	–	2	4	–	3	–	2
Tampa	2	–	2	–	0	5	–	4	–	0
Louisville	1	–	1	–	0	4	–	4	–	0
Middle Tennessee State Teachers	2	–	3	–	1	4	–	3	–	1
Newberry	2	–	3	–	0	5	–	6	–	0
Mississippi College	1	–	2	–	0	5	–	3	–	0
SE Louisiana	2	–	4	–	0	3	–	6	–	0
Oglethorpe	1	–	3	–	0	3	–	3	–	0
Transylvania	1	–	3	–	0	3	–	5	–	0
Troy State	1	–	4	–	0	5	–	4	–	0
Southeastern Louisiana	0	–	3	–	0	3	–	6	–	1
Louisiana College	1	–	5	–	0	4	–	7	–	0
Delta State	1	–	7	–	1	1	–	8	–	1
Centenary	0	–	1	–	1	0	–	8	–	2
Union (KY)	0	–	1	–	0	0	–	5	–	0
Morehead State	0	–	3	–	0	3	–	4	–	0
Erskine	0	–	4	–	0	2	–	5	–	0
$ – Conference champion

The 1941 Memphis State Tigers football team was an American football team that represented Memphis State College (now known as the University of Memphis) as a member of the Southern Intercollegiate Athletic Association during the 1941 college football season. In their third season under head coach Cecil C. Humphreys, Memphis State compiled a 6–3 record.

Memphis State was ranked at No. 225 (out of 681 teams) in the final rankings under the Litkenhous Difference by Score System.

== Schedule ==
Date	Opponent	Site	Result	Attendance	Source
September 23	Southwestern (TN)*	Crump Stadium; Memphis, TN	L 7–13	8,000	
October 3	Millsaps*	Crump Stadium; Memphis, TN	W 21–6		
October 11	Livingston State*	Crump Stadium; Memphis, TN	W 38–0		
October 17	at Union (TN)	Rothrock Field; Jackson, TN	W 7–6	2,200	
October 24	Delta State	Crump Stadium; Memphis, TN	W 23–7		
October 31	at Middle Tennessee State Teachers	Horace Jones Field; Murfreesboro, TN	L 12–13		
November 8	at Murray State	Murray, KY	L 6–31		
November 15	Troy State	Crump Stadium; Memphis, TN	W 32–0		
November 21	at Austin Peay*	Murtland Field; Clarksville, TN	W 26–0		
*Non-conference game
