= Cecil C. Humphreys =

American football and basketball player and coach (1890–1970)

Biographical details
- Born: May 17, 1914; Paris, Tennessee, U.S.
- Died: June 14, 1995 (aged 81); Memphis, Tennessee, U.S.

Playing career
- 1933–1935: Tennessee
- Position: End

Coaching career (HC unless noted)
- 1937–1938: West Tennessee State Teachers (assistant)
- 1939–1941: West Tennessee State Teachers / Memphis State

Administrative career (AD unless noted)
- 1947–1960: Memphis State

Head coaching record
- Overall: 14–16

Cecil Clarence "Sonny" Humphreys (May 17, 1914 – June 14, 1995) was an American college football player and coach, athletics administrator, professor, and university president. He served as the head football coach at Memphis State College—renamed from West Tennessee State Teachers College in 1941 and now known as the University of Memphis—from 1939 to 1941, compiling a record of 14–16. Humphreys was the athletic director at Memphis State from 1947 until 1960 and president of the university from 1960 to 1973. The Cecil C. Humphreys School of Law at the University of Memphis is named for him.

Humphreys was born in Paris, Tennessee and attended E.W. Grove Henry County High School, where he played on the school's undefeated football team in 1929. He moved on to the University of Tennessee, where he played football as an end from 1933 to 1935. Humphreys received a bachelor's degree in 1936 and a master's degree in 1938 from the University of Tennessee. He earned a doctorate from New York University (NYU) in 1957.

Humphreys began his teaching career in 1936 as a history instructor at the University of Tennessee Junior College—now known as the University of Tennessee at Martin. In 1937, he moved on to Memphis State to again teach history.

Humphreys died on June 14, 1995, at this home in Memphis, Tennessee.

== Head coaching record ==
Year	Team	Overall	Conference	Standing	Bowl/playoffs
West Tennessee State Teachers Tigers (Southern Intercollegiate Athletic Association) (1939–1941)
1939	West Tennessee State Teachers	3–8	3–4	T–20th	
1940	West Tennessee State Teachers	5–5	4–3	16th	
1941	Memphis State	6–3	3–2	13th	
West Tennessee State Teachers / Memphis State:		14–16	10–9		
Total:		14–16			
