= 1941 Oglethorpe Stormy Petrels football team =

American college football season

1941 Oglethorpe Stormy Petrels football
- Conference: Southern Intercollegiate Athletic Association
- Record: 3–3 (1–3 SIAA)
- Head coach: John W. Patrick (8th season)
- Home stadium: Hermance Stadium

1941 Southern Intercollegiate Athletic Association football standings
	Conf.					Overall
Team	W		L		T	W		L		T
Presbyterian $	5	–	0	–	0	6	–	3	–	0
Miami (FL)	2	–	0	–	0	8	–	2	–	0
Centre	2	–	0	–	0	3	–	4	–	0
Mississippi Southern	6	–	0	–	1	9	–	0	–	1
Louisiana Tech	5	–	1	–	0	5	–	4	–	1
Eastern Kentucky	3	–	1	–	0	7	–	1	–	0
SW Louisiana	3	–	1	–	1	6	–	2	–	1
Union (TN)	3	–	1	–	1	5	–	3	–	1
Tennessee Tech	3	–	1	–	0	5	–	4	–	0
Western Kentucky State Teachers	3	–	1	–	1	4	–	5	–	1
Georgetown (KY)	2	–	1	–	0	7	–	2	–	0
Wofford	2	–	1	–	0	4	–	6	–	0
Memphis State	3	–	2	–	0	6	–	3	–	0
Rollins	2	–	2	–	0	5	–	2	–	1
Louisiana Normal	3	–	3	–	1	4	–	3	–	1
Murray State	3	–	3	–	2	4	–	3	–	2
Tampa	2	–	2	–	0	5	–	4	–	0
Louisville	1	–	1	–	0	4	–	4	–	0
Middle Tennessee State Teachers	2	–	3	–	1	4	–	3	–	1
Newberry	2	–	3	–	0	5	–	6	–	0
Mississippi College	1	–	2	–	0	5	–	3	–	0
SE Louisiana	2	–	4	–	0	3	–	6	–	0
Oglethorpe	1	–	3	–	0	3	–	3	–	0
Transylvania	1	–	3	–	0	3	–	5	–	0
Troy State	1	–	4	–	0	5	–	4	–	0
Southeastern Louisiana	0	–	3	–	0	3	–	6	–	1
Louisiana College	1	–	5	–	0	4	–	7	–	0
Delta State	1	–	7	–	1	1	–	8	–	1
Centenary	0	–	1	–	1	0	–	8	–	2
Union (KY)	0	–	1	–	0	0	–	5	–	0
Morehead State	0	–	3	–	0	3	–	4	–	0
Erskine	0	–	4	–	0	2	–	5	–	0
$ – Conference champion

The 1941 Oglethorpe Stormy Petrels football team represented Oglethorpe University in the sport of American football as a member of the Southern Intercollegiate Athletic Association (SIAA) during the 1941 college football season. The 1941 season was the last season of football at Oglethorpe University. World War II caused the school to end all sports and after the war. A football team has never been restarted. Notable games include the game against Troy State that was decided by a field goal in the final seconds, the only score of the game.

== Schedule ==
Date	Opponent	Site	Result	Source
September 27	Presbyterian	Hermance Stadium; North Atlanta, GA	L 14–34	
October 10	Troy State	Hermance Stadium; North Atlanta, GA	L 0–3	
October 30	at Newberry	Pee Dee Fairgrounds; Florence, SC	L 0–13	
November 7	at Georgia Teachers*	Statesboro, GA	W 53–0	
November 22	Livingston*^{†}	Hermance Stadium; North Atlanta, GA	W 60–0	
November 28	vs. Troy State	Wiregrass Memorial Stadium; Dothan, AL	W 21–0	
*Non-conference game; ^{†}Homecoming
