= 1941 Mississippi College Choctaws football team =

American college football season

1941 Mississippi College Choctaws football
- Conference: Dixie Conference, Southern Intercollegiate Athletic Association
- Record: 5–3 (3–1 Dixie, 1–2 SIAA)
- Head coach: Stanley L. Robinson (17th season)
- Home stadium: Provine Field

1941 Dixie Conference football standings
	Conf.					Overall
Team	W		L		T	W		L		T
Chattanooga $	4	–	0	–	1	7	–	1	–	1
Howard (AL)	2	–	0	–	1	4	–	5	–	1
Mississippi College	3	–	1	–	0	5	–	3	–	0
Millsaps	1	–	1	–	0	4	–	5	–	0
Southwestern (TN)	0	–	1	–	0	4	–	4	–	1
Mercer	0	–	3	–	0	3	–	6	–	0
Spring Hill	0	–	4	–	0	2	–	6	–	0
$ – Conference champion

1941 Southern Intercollegiate Athletic Association football standings
	Conf.					Overall
Team	W		L		T	W		L		T
Presbyterian $	5	–	0	–	0	6	–	3	–	0
Miami (FL)	2	–	0	–	0	8	–	2	–	0
Centre	2	–	0	–	0	3	–	4	–	0
Mississippi Southern	6	–	0	–	1	9	–	0	–	1
Louisiana Tech	5	–	1	–	0	5	–	4	–	1
Eastern Kentucky	3	–	1	–	0	7	–	1	–	0
SW Louisiana	3	–	1	–	1	6	–	2	–	1
Union (TN)	3	–	1	–	1	5	–	3	–	1
Tennessee Tech	3	–	1	–	0	5	–	4	–	0
Western Kentucky State Teachers	3	–	1	–	1	4	–	5	–	1
Georgetown (KY)	2	–	1	–	0	7	–	2	–	0
Wofford	2	–	1	–	0	4	–	6	–	0
Memphis State	3	–	2	–	0	6	–	3	–	0
Rollins	2	–	2	–	0	5	–	2	–	1
Louisiana Normal	3	–	3	–	1	4	–	3	–	1
Murray State	3	–	3	–	2	4	–	3	–	2
Tampa	2	–	2	–	0	5	–	4	–	0
Louisville	1	–	1	–	0	4	–	4	–	0
Middle Tennessee State Teachers	2	–	3	–	1	4	–	3	–	1
Newberry	2	–	3	–	0	5	–	6	–	0
Mississippi College	1	–	2	–	0	5	–	3	–	0
SE Louisiana	2	–	4	–	0	3	–	6	–	0
Oglethorpe	1	–	3	–	0	3	–	3	–	0
Transylvania	1	–	3	–	0	3	–	5	–	0
Troy State	1	–	4	–	0	5	–	4	–	0
Southeastern Louisiana	0	–	3	–	0	3	–	6	–	1
Louisiana College	1	–	5	–	0	4	–	7	–	0
Delta State	1	–	7	–	1	1	–	8	–	1
Centenary	0	–	1	–	1	0	–	8	–	2
Union (KY)	0	–	1	–	0	0	–	5	–	0
Morehead State	0	–	3	–	0	3	–	4	–	0
Erskine	0	–	4	–	0	2	–	5	–	0
$ – Conference champion

The 1941 Mississippi College Choctaws football team was an American football team that represented Mississippi College as a member of the Dixie Conference and the Southern Intercollegiate Athletic Association (SIAA) in the 1941 college football season. Led by Stanley L. Robinson in his 17th season as head coach, the team compiled an overall record of 5–3 and with a mark of 3–1 in Dixie Conference play and 1–2 against SIAA competition.

== Schedule ==
Date	Opponent	Site	Result	Source
September 27	at Centre	Farris Stadium; Danville, KY	L 7–14	
October 4	Union (TN)	Provine Field; Clinton, MS	L 9–26	
October 10	at Chattanooga	Chamberlain Field; Chattanooga, TN	L 6–26	
October 18	Delta State*	Provine Field; Clinton, MS (rivalry)	W 17–6	
November 3	at Millsaps	Alumni Field; Jackson, MS (rivalry)	W 21–0	
November 8	Mercer	Provine Field; Clinton, MS	W 27–19	
November 15	at Spring Hill	Dorn Stadium; Mobile, AL	W 53–7	
November 21	at 113th Medical Regiment*	Hattiesburg H.S. Stadium; Hattiesburg, MS	W 56–0	
*Non-conference game
