= 1948 Southwestern Louisiana Bulldogs football team =

American college football season

1948 Southwestern Louisiana Bulldogs football
- Conference: Gulf States Conference
- Record: 6–3–1 (3–2 GSC)
- Head coach: Gee Mitchell (2nd season)
- Home stadium: McNaspy Stadium

1948 Gulf States Conference football standings
	Conf.					Overall
Team	W		L		T	W		L		T
Mississippi Southern $	4	–	0	–	0	7	–	3	–	0
Louisiana Tech	4	–	1	–	0	7	–	2	–	1
Southwestern Louisiana	3	–	2	–	0	6	–	3	–	1
Northwestern State	2	–	3	–	0	5	–	3	–	1
Louisiana College	1	–	3	–	0	2	–	8	–	0
Southeastern Louisiana	0	–	5	–	0	3	–	6	–	1
$ – Conference champion

The 1948 Southwestern Louisiana Bulldogs football team was an American football team that represented the Southwestern Louisiana Institute of Liberal and Technical Learning (now known as the University of Louisiana at Lafayette) in the Gulf States Conference during the 1948 college football season. In their second year under head coach Gee Mitchell, the team compiled a 6–3–1 record.

== Schedule ==
Date	Opponent	Site	Result	Attendance	Source
September 18	at Austin*	Sherman, TX	L 0–14		
September 25	Troy State*	McNaspy Stadium; Lafayette, LA	W 26–19		
October 2	Houston*	McNaspy Stadium; Lafayette, LA	W 21–7	7,500	
October 8	at Southeastern Louisiana	Strawberry Stadium; Hammond, LA (rivalry)	W 19–12		
October 15	at Mississippi Southern	Ladd Stadium; Mobile, AL	L 6–26	8,433	
October 23	at Louisiana College	Bolton Stadium; Alexandria, LA	W 26–7		
October 30	Louisiana Tech	McNaspy Stadium; Lafayette, LA (rivalry)	L 14–24		
November 6	Sam Houston State*	McNaspy Stadium; Lafayette, LA	T 12–12		
November 13	Pensacola NAS*	McNaspy Stadium; Lafayette, LA	W 27–6		
November 20	at Northwestern State	Demon Stadium; Natchitoches, LA	W 28–7	5,500	
*Non-conference game
