= Jesse Fatherree =

American athlete and coach (1913–1962)

Biographical details
- Born: June 7, 1913; Jackson, Mississippi, U.S.
- Died: July 23, 1962 (aged 49); Fort Worth, Texas, U.S.

Playing career

Football
- 1933–1935: LSU

Basketball
- 1932–1934: LSU

Baseball
- 1934–1936: LSU
- Positions: Halfback (football); Guard (basketball)

Coaching career (HC unless noted)

Football
- 1938–1940: Southeastern Louisiana (backfield)
- 1941: Southeastern Louisiana
- 1942–1948: LSU (backfield)
- 1949–?: Mississippi State (backfield)

Basketball
- 1944–1945: LSU

Head coaching record
- Overall: 4–5 (football); 11–7 (basketball)

Accomplishments and honors

Awards
- Third-team All-American (1935); First-team All-SEC (1935); Mississippi Sports Hall of Fame (1964)

Jesse Levi Fatherree Jr. (June 7, 1913 – July 23, 1962) was an American football, basketball, and baseball player and coach. Fatherree was inducted into the Mississippi Sports Hall of Fame in 1964.

== Playing career ==
Fatherree lettered in football, basketball, and baseball at LSU in the 1930s.

== Head coaching career ==
Fatherree was the fourth head football coach at Southeastern Louisiana College—now known as Southeastern Louisiana University—and held that position for the 1941 season. His coaching record at Southeastern Louisiana was 4–5.

He was also the head basketball coach at Louisiana State University (LSU) for the first 18 games of the 1944–45 season, tallying a mark of 11–7.

== Assistant coaching career ==
Fatherree was the backfield coach for the LSU Tigers football team from 1942 and 1948 and was hired at Mississippi State College—now known as Mississippi State University—in the same role in 1949.

== Personal life ==
Fatherree moved to Fort Worth, Texas in 1952 and worked as sales manager for a firm that sold aircraft parts. He died at a hospital there on July 23, 1962.

== Head coaching record ==
=== Football ===
Year	Team	Overall	Conference	Standing	Bowl/playoffs
Southeastern Louisiana Lions (Louisiana Intercollegiate Conference) (1941)
1941	Southeastern Louisiana	4–5	1–3	4th	
Southeastern Louisiana:		4–5	1–3		
Total:		4–5			

=== Basketball ===
Record table
Season	Team	Overall	Conference	Standing	Postseason
LSU Tigers (Southeastern Conference) (1944–1945)
1944–45	LSU	11–7	3–2		
LSU:		11–7 (.611)	3–2 (.600)		
Total:		11–7 (.611)			
