= 1948 Mississippi Southern Southerners football team =

American college football season

1948 Mississippi Southern Southerners football

GSC champion
- Conference: Gulf States Conference
- Record: 7–3 (4–0 GSC)
- Head coach: Reed Green (9th season)
- Home stadium: Faulkner Field

1948 Gulf States Conference football standings
	Conf.					Overall
Team	W		L		T	W		L		T
Mississippi Southern $	4	–	0	–	0	7	–	3	–	0
Louisiana Tech	4	–	1	–	0	7	–	2	–	1
Southwestern Louisiana	3	–	2	–	0	6	–	3	–	1
Northwestern State	2	–	3	–	0	5	–	3	–	1
Louisiana College	1	–	3	–	0	2	–	8	–	0
Southeastern Louisiana	0	–	5	–	0	3	–	6	–	1
$ – Conference champion

The 1948 Mississippi Southern Southerners football team was an American football team that represented Mississippi Southern College (now known as the University of Southern Mississippi) as a member of the Gulf States Conference during the 1948 college football season. In their ninth year under head coach Reed Green, the team compiled a 7–3 record.

Mississippi Southern was ranked at No. 108 in the final Litkenhous Difference by Score System ratings for 1948.

== Schedule ==
Date	Opponent	Site	Result	Attendance	Source
September 24	at Auburn*	Cramton Bowl; Montgomery, AL	L 14–20	16,000	
October 1	Austin*	Faulkner Field; Hattiesburg, MS	W 41–0	8,000	
October 9	Trinity (TX)*	Faulkner Field; Hattiesburg, MS	L 9–26	7,000	
October 15	Southwestern Louisiana	Ladd Stadium; Mobile, AL	W 26–6	8,433	
October 23	at Oklahoma City*	Taft Stadium; Oklahoma City, OK	W 55–20	6,000	
October 30	at Northwestern State	Demon Stadium; Natchitoches, LA	W 38–14	5,000	
November 6	at Alabama*	Denny Stadium; Tuscaloosa, AL	L 0–27	20,000	
November 13	Louisiana Tech^{†}	Faulkner Field; Hattiesburg, MS (rivalry)	W 20–6	9,000	
November 19	Southeastern Louisiana	Faulkner Field; Hattiesburg, MS	W 27–0		
November 24	Union (TN)*	Faulkner Field; Hattiesburg, MS	W 47–8		
*Non-conference game; ^{†}Homecoming
