= Gee Mitchell =

American football and boxing coach (1912–1984)

Biographical details
- Born: March 15, 1912; Rayville, Louisiana, U.S.
- Died: October 27, 1984 (aged 72); Thibodaux, Louisiana, U.S.

Playing career

Football
- 1932–1933: LSU
- Position: Guard

Coaching career (HC unless noted)

Football
- 1935–1943: Southwestern Louisiana (line)
- 1947–1949: Southwestern Louisiana

Boxing
- 1935–1944: Southwestern Louisiana

Administrative career (AD unless noted)
- 1946–1949: Southwestern Louisiana

Head coaching record
- Overall: 18–8–1 (football)

George "Gee" Mitchell (March 15, 1912 – October 27, 1984) was an American football and boxing coach and college athletic administrator. He served as the head football coach at the Southwestern Louisiana Institute of Liberal and Technical Learning (now known as the University of Louisiana at Lafayette) from 1947 to 1949, compiling a record of 18–8–1.

A native of Rayville, Louisiana, Mitchell was a letterman while playing guard for LSU during their 1932 and 1933 seasons. Mitchell was hired at Southwestern Louisiana in 1935 to serve as both head boxing coach and as line coach on the football team. After leaving the program to serve in the Army during World War II from 1943 to 1945, Mitchell returned to Southwestern as athletic director in 1946 and then as head football coach from 1947 to 1949. In 1950, Mitchell accepted a position at then Francis T. Nicholls Junior College (now known as Nicholls State University) to establish its athletics program. He remained at Nicholls through 1973 when he retired as a full professor.

== Head coaching record ==
=== College football ===
Year	Team	Overall	Conference	Standing	Bowl/playoffs
Southwestern Louisiana Bulldogs (Louisiana Intercollegiate Conference) (1947)
1947	Southwestern Louisiana	6–2	4–1	2nd	
Southwestern Louisiana Bulldogs (Gulf States Conference) (1948–1949)
1948	Southwestern Louisiana	6–3–1	3–2	3rd	
1949	Southwestern Louisiana	6–3	3–2	3rd	
Southwestern Louisiana:		18–8–1			
Total:		18–8–1			
