= 1941 Western Kentucky State Teachers Hilltoppers football team =

American college football season

1941 Western Kentucky State Teachers Hilltoppers football
- Conference: Southern Intercollegiate Athletic Association
- Record: 4–5–1 (3–1–1 SIAA)
- Head coach: Gander Terry (4th season)

1941 Southern Intercollegiate Athletic Association football standings
	Conf.					Overall
Team	W		L		T	W		L		T
Presbyterian $	5	–	0	–	0	6	–	3	–	0
Miami (FL)	2	–	0	–	0	8	–	2	–	0
Centre	2	–	0	–	0	3	–	4	–	0
Mississippi Southern	6	–	0	–	1	9	–	0	–	1
Louisiana Tech	5	–	1	–	0	5	–	4	–	1
Eastern Kentucky	3	–	1	–	0	7	–	1	–	0
SW Louisiana	3	–	1	–	1	6	–	2	–	1
Union (TN)	3	–	1	–	1	5	–	3	–	1
Tennessee Tech	3	–	1	–	0	5	–	4	–	0
Western Kentucky State Teachers	3	–	1	–	1	4	–	5	–	1
Georgetown (KY)	2	–	1	–	0	7	–	2	–	0
Wofford	2	–	1	–	0	4	–	6	–	0
Memphis State	3	–	2	–	0	6	–	3	–	0
Rollins	2	–	2	–	0	5	–	2	–	1
Louisiana Normal	3	–	3	–	1	4	–	3	–	1
Murray State	3	–	3	–	2	4	–	3	–	2
Tampa	2	–	2	–	0	5	–	4	–	0
Louisville	1	–	1	–	0	4	–	4	–	0
Middle Tennessee State Teachers	2	–	3	–	1	4	–	3	–	1
Newberry	2	–	3	–	0	5	–	6	–	0
Mississippi College	1	–	2	–	0	5	–	3	–	0
SE Louisiana	2	–	4	–	0	3	–	6	–	0
Oglethorpe	1	–	3	–	0	3	–	3	–	0
Transylvania	1	–	3	–	0	3	–	5	–	0
Troy State	1	–	4	–	0	5	–	4	–	0
Southeastern Louisiana	0	–	3	–	0	3	–	6	–	1
Louisiana College	1	–	5	–	0	4	–	7	–	0
Delta State	1	–	7	–	1	1	–	8	–	1
Centenary	0	–	1	–	1	0	–	8	–	2
Union (KY)	0	–	1	–	0	0	–	5	–	0
Morehead State	0	–	3	–	0	3	–	4	–	0
Erskine	0	–	4	–	0	2	–	5	–	0
$ – Conference champion

The 1941 Western Kentucky State Teachers Hilltoppers football team represented Western Kentucky State Teachers College (now known as Western Kentucky University) as a member of the Southern Intercollegiate Athletic Association (SIAA) during the 1941 college football season. Led by Gander Terry in his fourth and final season as head coach, the Hilltoppers compiled an overall record of 4–5–1 with a mark of 3–1–1 in conference play.

Western Kentucky was ranked at No. 157 (out of 681 teams) in the final rankings under the Litkenhous Difference by Score System for 1941.

== Schedule ==
Date	Opponent	Site	Result	Attendance	Source
September 19	at Austin Peay*	Clarksville, TN	W 38–0		
September 27	at Morehead State	Morehead, KY	W 14–0		
October 3	at Middle Tennessee State Teachers	Murfreesboro, TN (rivalry)	W 15–7		
October 11	at Ohio*	Ohio Stadium; Athens, OH	L 7–20	7,000	
October 18	at Marshall*	Fairfield Stadium; Huntington, WV	L 7–34		
October 25	Eastern Kentucky^{†}	Bowling Green, KY (rivalry)	W 27–20		
November 1	at Western Michigan*	Kalamazoo, MI	L 7–21		
November 7	at Tennessee Tech	Cookeville, TN	L 6–27		
November 14	Howard (AL)*	Bowling Green, KY	L 7–20	5,000	
November 20	Murray State	Bowling Green, KY (rivalry)	T 0–0		
*Non-conference game; ^{†}Homecoming
