= 1941 Presbyterian Blue Hose football team =

American college football season

1941 Presbyterian Blue Hose football

SIAA champion
- Conference: Southern Intercollegiate Athletic Association
- Record: 6–3 (5–0 SIAA)
- Head coach: Lonnie McMillian (1st season)
- Captains: Verne Church; Lloyd Evans
- Home stadium: Old Bailey Stadium

1941 Southern Intercollegiate Athletic Association football standings
	Conf.					Overall
Team	W		L		T	W		L		T
Presbyterian $	5	–	0	–	0	6	–	3	–	0
Miami (FL)	2	–	0	–	0	8	–	2	–	0
Centre	2	–	0	–	0	3	–	4	–	0
Mississippi Southern	6	–	0	–	1	9	–	0	–	1
Louisiana Tech	5	–	1	–	0	5	–	4	–	1
Eastern Kentucky	3	–	1	–	0	7	–	1	–	0
SW Louisiana	3	–	1	–	1	6	–	2	–	1
Union (TN)	3	–	1	–	1	5	–	3	–	1
Tennessee Tech	3	–	1	–	0	5	–	4	–	0
Western Kentucky State Teachers	3	–	1	–	1	4	–	5	–	1
Georgetown (KY)	2	–	1	–	0	7	–	2	–	0
Wofford	2	–	1	–	0	4	–	6	–	0
Memphis State	3	–	2	–	0	6	–	3	–	0
Rollins	2	–	2	–	0	5	–	2	–	1
Louisiana Normal	3	–	3	–	1	4	–	3	–	1
Murray State	3	–	3	–	2	4	–	3	–	2
Tampa	2	–	2	–	0	5	–	4	–	0
Louisville	1	–	1	–	0	4	–	4	–	0
Middle Tennessee State Teachers	2	–	3	–	1	4	–	3	–	1
Newberry	2	–	3	–	0	5	–	6	–	0
Mississippi College	1	–	2	–	0	5	–	3	–	0
SE Louisiana	2	–	4	–	0	3	–	6	–	0
Oglethorpe	1	–	3	–	0	3	–	3	–	0
Transylvania	1	–	3	–	0	3	–	5	–	0
Troy State	1	–	4	–	0	5	–	4	–	0
Southeastern Louisiana	0	–	3	–	0	3	–	6	–	1
Louisiana College	1	–	5	–	0	4	–	7	–	0
Delta State	1	–	7	–	1	1	–	8	–	1
Centenary	0	–	1	–	1	0	–	8	–	2
Union (KY)	0	–	1	–	0	0	–	5	–	0
Morehead State	0	–	3	–	0	3	–	4	–	0
Erskine	0	–	4	–	0	2	–	5	–	0
$ – Conference champion

The 1941 Presbyterian Blue Hose football team was an American football team that represented Presbyterian College as a member of the Southern Intercollegiate Athletic Association (SIAA) during the 1941 college football season. Led by head coach Lonnie McMillian, the team compiled a 6–3 record (5–0 against SIAA opponents) and won the SIAA championship. Verne Church and Lloyd Evans were the team captains.

Presbyterian was ranked at No. 193 (out of 681 teams) in the final rankings under the Litkenhous Difference by Score System.

The team played its home games at Old Bailey Stadium in Clinton, South Carolina.

== Schedule ==
Date	Opponent	Site	Result	Attendance	Source
September 20	at Clemson*	Riggs Field; Clemson, SC	L 12–41	6,000	
September 27	at Oglethorpe	Hermance Stadium; Atlanta, GA	W 34–14		
October 10	vs. The Citadel*	Sumter County Fair Grounds; Sumter, SC	L 13–21		
October 17	Newberry	Old Bailey Stadium; Clinton, SC	W 13–7		
October 24	Camp Croft*	Old Bailey Stadium; Clinton, SC	W 12–6	4,000	
November 1	at Mercer*	Macon, GA	L 12–19		
November 8	vs. Erskine	Municipal Stadium; Rock Hill, SC	W 21–0	3,000	
November 15	Wofford	Old Bailey Stadium; Clinton, SC	W 44–0		
November 21	at Rollins	Orlando, FL	W 14–6		
*Non-conference game
