= Jess Thompson =

American gridiron football and basketball coach (1907–1975)

Biographical details
- Born: August 14, 1907; Temple, Oklahoma, U.S.
- Died: January 26, 1975 (aged 67); Hempstead, New York, U.S.

Playing career

Football
- 1928–1930: Central State (OK)
- Position: Center

Coaching career (HC unless noted)

Football
- 1931–1933: Seminole HS (OK)
- 1934–1935: Cameron (line)
- 1936–1937: Jet HS (OK)
- 1939–1941: Cameron
- 1946: Cameron
- 1947: Centenary
- 1948: Mississippi Southern (assistant)
- 1951–1954: Cameron
- 1955–1959: Tulsa (line)
- 1960: Texas Tech (line)
- 1961–1964: Calgary Stampeders (assistant)

Basketball
- 1948–1949: Mississippi Southern

Head coaching record
- Overall: 1–9–1 (college football); 6–10 (college basketball); 57–23–1 (junior college football)

Accomplishments and honors

Championships
- Football; 4 OJCC (1939, 1941, 1946, 1954)

Jess E. Thompson (August 14, 1907 – January 26, 1975) was an American gridiron football, and basketball coach. He served three stints as the head football coach at Cameron University in Lawton, Oklahoma—1939 to 1941, in 1946, and 1951 to 1954—and at Centenary College of Louisiana in 1947. Thompson was also the head basketball coach at Mississippi Southern College—now known as the University of Southern Mississippi—from 1948 to 1949. He was assistant coach for the Calgary Stampeders of the Canadian Football League (CFL) for four seasons and also served as a scout for the Houston Oilers and New York Jets of the National Football League (NFL).

Thompson died of an apparent heart attack, on January 26, 1975, at a hotel in Hempstead, New York.

== Head coaching record ==
=== College football ===
Year	Team	Overall	Conference	Standing
Centenary Gentlemen (Louisiana Intercollegiate Conference) (1947)
1947	Centenary	1–9–1	1–4	5th
Centenary:		1–9–1	1–4	
Total:		1–9–1		

=== College basketball ===
Record table
Season	Team	Overall	Conference	Standing	Postseason
Mississippi Southern Southerners (Gulf States Conference) (1948–1949)
1948–49	Mississippi Southern	6–10	5–9	8th	
Mississippi Southern:		6–10 (.375)	5–9 (.357)		
Total:		6–10 (.375)			

=== Junior college football ===
Year	Team	Overall	Conference	Standing	Bowl/playoffs
Cameron Aggies (Oklahoma Junior College Conference) (1939–1941)
1939	Cameron	8–1	4–0	1st	
1940	Cameron	8–3			
1941	Cameron	8–2–1	3–0	1st	
Cameron Aggies (Oklahoma Junior College Conference) (1946)
1946	Cameron	10–1	6–0		W Papoose Bowl
Cameron Aggies (Big Six Junior College Conference) (1951–1952)
1951	Cameron	6–4	1–2	3rd	
1952	Cameron	7–3	3–1	2nd	
Cameron Aggies () (1953)
1953	Cameron	4–6			
Cameron Aggies (Oklahoma Junior College Conference) (1954)
1954	Cameron	6–3	4–0	1st	
Cameron:		57–21–1			
Total:		57–23–1			
National championship Conference title Conference division title or championship game berth
