= Ned McGehee =

American football and baseball coach and college athletics administrator

Biographical details
- Born: April 9, 1907; Hammond, Louisiana, U.S.
- Died: March 3, 1989 (aged 81); Hammond, Louisiana, U.S.

Coaching career (HC unless noted)

Football
- 1946–1950: Southeastern Louisiana

Baseball
- 1949: Southeastern Louisiana

Administrative career (AD unless noted)
- 1946–1971: Southeastern Louisiana

Head coaching record
- Overall: 25–20–3 (football); 7–11 (baseball)
- Bowls: 1–0

Accomplishments and honors

Championships
- Football; 1 LIC (1946)

Edward Larned McGehee III (April 9, 1907 – March 3, 1989) was an American football and baseball coach and college athletics administrator. He was the sixth head football coach at the Southeastern Louisiana University and held that position for five seasons, from 1946 until 1950. His coaching record at Southeastern Louisiana was 25–20–3. McGehee was also the head baseball coach at Southeastern Louisiana for one season, in 1949, tallying a mark of 7–11. He was the school's athletic director from 1946 to 1971.

McGehee died on March 3, 1989, at his home in Hammond, Louisiana. A road on the Southeastern Louisiana University campus was dedicated in his honour in 2012.

== Head coaching record ==
=== Football ===
Year	Team	Overall	Conference	Standing	Bowl/playoffs
Southeastern Louisiana Lions (Louisiana Intercollegiate Conference) (1946–1947)
1946	Southeastern Louisiana	9–0	4–0	1st	W Burley Bowl
1947	Southeastern Louisiana	3–5–1	2–3	4th	
Southeastern Louisiana Lions (Gulf States Conference) (1948–1950)
1948	Southeastern Louisiana	3–6–1	0–5	6th	
1949	Southeastern Louisiana	4–5–1	1–2–1	4th	
1950	Southeastern Louisiana	6–4	2–3	T–4th	
Southeastern Louisiana:		25–20–3	9–13–1		
Total:		25–20–3			
National championship Conference title Conference division title or championship game berth
