= 1948 Houston Cougars football team =

American college football season

1948 Houston Cougars football
- Conference: Lone Star Conference
- Record: 5–6 (3–3 LSC)
- Head coach: Clyde Lee (1st season)
- Captains: Cecil Towns; Jack Gwin
- Home stadium: Public School Stadium

1948 Lone Star Conference football standings
	Conf.					Overall
Team	W		L		T	W		L		T
Southwest Texas State $	6	–	0	–	0	8	–	1	–	0
North Texas State	4	–	2	–	0	6	–	4	–	0
Stephen F. Austin	3	–	2	–	1	7	–	2	–	1
Trinity (TX)	2	–	2	–	2	6	–	2	–	2
Houston	3	–	3	–	0	5	–	6	–	0
East Texas State	1	–	4	–	1	3	–	6	–	1
Sam Houston State	0	–	6	–	0	0	–	9	–	1
$ – Conference champion

The 1948 Houston Cougars football team was an American football team that represented the University of Houston as a member of the Lone Star Conference (LSC) during the 1948 college football season. In its first season under head coach Clyde Lee, the team compiled a 5–6 record (3–4 against LSC opponents) and finished in the fourth place in the conference. Cecil Towns and Jack Gwin were the team captains.

Houston was ranked at No. 198 in the final Litkenhous Difference by Score System ratings for 1948.

The team played its home games at Public School Stadium in Houston.

== Schedule ==
Date	Opponent	Site	Result	Attendance	Source
September 18	Texas A&I*	Public School Stadium; Houston, TX	W 14–0	8,000	
September 25	at Texas Mines*	Kidd Field; El Paso, TX	L 7–35	6,000	
October 2	at Southwestern Louisiana*	McNaspy Stadium; Lafayette, LA	L 7–21	7,500	
October 9	Louisiana Tech*	Public School Stadium; Houston, TX	W 40–33	5,000	
October 16	at East Texas State*	Lion Stadium; Commerce, TX	W 18–7		
October 23	at Trinity (TX)	Alamo Stadium; San Antonio, TX	L 7–15		
October 30	at West Texas State*	Buffalo Stadium; Canyon, TX	L 13–28	6,000	
November 6	Stephen F. Austin^{†}	Public School Stadium; Houston, TX	L 13–21		
November 13	North Texas State	Public School Stadium; Houston, TX	W 8–6	3,000	
November 20	at Southwest Texas State	Evans Field; San Marcos, TX	L 0–3	5,000	
November 25	Sam Houston State	Public School Stadium; Houston, TX	W 22–13		
*Non-conference game; ^{†}Homecoming
