= 1948 Sam Houston State Bearkats football team =

American college football season

1948 Sam Houston State Bearkats football
- Conference: Lone Star Conference
- Record: 0–9–1 (0–6 LSC)
- Head coach: Puny Wilson (8th season)
- Home stadium: Pritchett Field

1948 Lone Star Conference football standings
	Conf.					Overall
Team	W		L		T	W		L		T
Southwest Texas State $	6	–	0	–	0	8	–	1	–	0
North Texas State	4	–	2	–	0	6	–	4	–	0
Stephen F. Austin	3	–	2	–	1	7	–	2	–	1
Trinity (TX)	2	–	2	–	2	6	–	2	–	2
Houston	3	–	3	–	0	5	–	6	–	0
East Texas State	1	–	4	–	1	3	–	6	–	1
Sam Houston State	0	–	6	–	0	0	–	9	–	1
$ – Conference champion

The 1948 Sam Houston State Bearkats football team represented Sam Houston State Teachers College (now known as Sam Houston State University) as a member of the Lone Star Conference (LSC) during the 1948 college football season. Led by eighth-year head coach Puny Wilson, the Bearkats compiled an overall record of 0–9–1 with a mark of 0–6 in conference play, and finished sixth in the LSC.

== Schedule ==
Date	Opponent	Site	Result	Attendance	Source
September 18	Sul Ross*	Pritchett Field; Huntsville, TX	L 19–20		
September 25	at Rice*	Rice Field; Houston, TX	L 0–46	22,000	
October 9	Texas A&I*	Pritchett Field; Huntsville, TX	L 6–32		
October 16	Trinity (TX)	Pritchett Field; Huntsville, TX	L 0–21		
October 23	at North Texas State	Eagle Field; Denton, TX	L 7–37		
October 30	at East Texas State	Commerce, TX	L 21–27		
November 6	at Southwestern Louisiana*	McNaspy Stadium; Lafayette, LA	T 12–12		
November 13	Southwest Texas State	Pritchett Field; Huntsville, TX (rivalry)	L 0–14		
November 20	Stephen F. Austin^{†}	Pritchett Field; Huntsville, TX (rivalry)	L 0–21	5,000	
November 25	at Houston	Public School Stadium; Houston, TX	L 13–22		
*Non-conference game; ^{†}Homecoming
