= 1948 Southwest Texas State Bobcats football team =

American college football season

1948 Southwest Texas State Bobcats football

LSC champion
- Conference: Lone Star Conference
- Record: 8–1 (6–0 LSC)
- Head coach: George Vest (3rd season)
- Home stadium: Evans Field

1948 Lone Star Conference football standings
	Conf.					Overall
Team	W		L		T	W		L		T
Southwest Texas State $	6	–	0	–	0	8	–	1	–	0
North Texas State	4	–	2	–	0	6	–	4	–	0
Stephen F. Austin	3	–	2	–	1	7	–	2	–	1
Trinity (TX)	2	–	2	–	2	6	–	2	–	2
Houston	3	–	3	–	0	5	–	6	–	0
East Texas State	1	–	4	–	1	3	–	6	–	1
Sam Houston State	0	–	6	–	0	0	–	9	–	1
$ – Conference champion

The 1948 Southwest Texas State Bobcats football team was an American football team that represented Southwest Texas State Teachers College (now known as Texas State University) during the 1948 college football season as a member of the Lone Star Conference (LSC). In their third year under head coach George Vest, the team compiled an overall record of 8–1 with a mark of 6–0 in conference play, and finished as Lone Star champion.

Southwest Texas was ranked at No. 149 in the final Litkenhous Difference by Score System ratings for 1948.

== Schedule ==
Date	Opponent	Site	Result	Attendance	Source
September 18	Daniel Baker*	Evans Field; San Marcos, TX	W 39–0		
September 24	at Trinity (TX)	Harlandale Stadium; San Antonio, TX	W 14–0	5,000	
October 2	at Texas A&I*	Kingsville, TX	L 2–13		
October 9	at Howard Payne*	Brownwood, TX	W 10–7	4,500	
October 23	Stephen F. Austin	Evans Field; San Marcos, TX	W 3–0		
October 30	North Texas State	Evans Field; San Marcos, TX	W 24–14		
November 6	at East Texas State	Commerce, TX	W 6–0		
November 13	at Sam Houston State	Pritchett Field; Huntsville, TX (rivalry)	W 14–0		
November 20	Houston	Evans Field; San Marcos, TX	W 3–0	5,000	
*Non-conference game
