= 1947 Louisiana Tech Bulldogs football team =

American college football season

1947 Louisiana Tech Bulldogs football

LIC champion
- Conference: Louisiana Intercollegiate Conference
- Record: 5–4 (5–0 LIC)
- Head coach: Joe Aillet (7th season)
- Captain: Charlie Newman
- Home stadium: Tech Stadium

1947 Louisiana Intercollegiate Conference football standings
	Conf.					Overall
Team	W		L		T	W		L		T
Louisiana Tech $	5	–	0	–	0	5	–	4	–	0
Southwestern Louisiana	4	–	1	–	0	6	–	2	–	0
Northwestern State	3	–	2	–	0	4	–	5	–	0
Southeastern Louisiana	2	–	3	–	0	3	–	5	–	1
Centenary	1	–	4	–	0	1	–	9	–	1
Louisiana College	0	–	4	–	0	1	–	5	–	1
$ – Conference champion

The 1947 Louisiana Tech Bulldogs football team was an American football team that represented the Louisiana Polytechnic Institute (now known as Louisiana Tech University) as a member of the Louisiana Intercollegiate Conference during the 1947 college football season. In their seventh year under head coach Joe Aillet, the team compiled a 5–4 record and finished as Louisiana Intercollegiate Conference champions.

In the final Litkenhous Ratings released in mid-December, Louisiana Tech was ranked at No. 190 out of 500 college football teams.

== Schedule ==
Date	Opponent	Site	Result	Attendance	Source
September 27	Howard Payne*	Tech Stadium; Ruston, LA	L 0–14		
October 4	at Auburn*	Auburn Stadium; Auburn, AL	L 0–14	11,000	
October 11	Mississippi Southern*	Tech Stadium; Ruston, LA (rivalry)	L 6–7	6,000	
October 18	at Louisiana College	Alumni Field; Pineville, LA	W 30–12		
October 25	vs. Northwestern State	State Fair Stadium; Shreveport, LA (rivalry)	W 24–0	10,000	
November 1	Southwestern Louisiana	Tech Stadium; Ruston, LA (rivalry)	W 9–0		
November 8	at Southeastern Louisiana	Strawberry Stadium; Hammond, LA	W 20–18		
November 15	at Oklahoma City*	Taft Stadium; Oklahoma City, OK	L 13–28	4,000	
November 27	Centenary	Tech Stadium; Ruston, LA	W 52–14	6,000	
*Non-conference game
