= 1949 Mississippi Southern Southerners football team =

American college football season

1949 Mississippi Southern Southerners football
- Conference: Gulf States Conference
- Record: 7–3 (2–1 GSC)
- Head coach: Thad Vann (1st season)
- Home stadium: Faulkner Field

1949 Gulf States Conference football standings
	Conf.					Overall
Team	W		L		T	W		L		T
Louisiana Tech $	5	–	0	–	0	7	–	2	–	0
Mississippi Southern	2	–	1	–	0	7	–	3	–	0
Southwestern Louisiana	3	–	2	–	0	6	–	3	–	0
Southeastern Louisiana	1	–	2	–	1	4	–	5	–	1
Northwestern State	1	–	4	–	0	5	–	4	–	0
Louisiana College	0	–	3	–	1	4	–	6	–	1
$ – Conference champion

The 1949 Mississippi Southern Southerners football team was an American football team that represented Mississippi Southern College (now known as the University of Southern Mississippi) as a member of the Gulf States Conference during the 1949 college football season. In their first year under head coach Thad Vann, the team compiled a 7–3 record.

== Schedule ==
Date	Time	Opponent	Site	Result	Attendance	Source
September 17		at Kentucky*	McLean Stadium; Lexington, KY	L 7–71	25,000	
September 24		Delta State*	Faulkner Field; Hattiesburg, MS	W 20–13		
October 8		McMurry*^{†}	Faulkner Field; Hattiesburg, MS	W 55–32	10,000	
October 15		at Southwestern Louisiana	McNaspy Stadium; Lafayette, LA	W 25–0	11,000	
October 21		at Chattanooga*	Chamberlain Field; Chattanooga, TN	W 33–20	7,500	
October 29	8:00 p.m.	Northwestern State	Faulkner Field; Hattiesburg, MS	W 67–28	9,000	
November 5		Oklahoma City*	Faulkner Field; Hattiesburg, MS	W 27–21		
November 12		at Louisiana Tech	Tech Stadium; Ruston, LA (rivalry)	L 13–34	6,000	
November 19		at Alabama*	Denny Stadium; Tuscaloosa, AL	L 26–34	15,000	
November 24		Louisville*	Faulkner Field; Hattiesburg, MS	W 26–21	10,000	
*Non-conference game; ^{†}Homecoming; All times are in Central time
