= 1941 Middle Tennessee State Teachers Blue Raiders football team =

American college football season

1941 Middle Tennessee State Teachers Blue Raiders football
- Conference: Southern Intercollegiate Athletic Association
- Record: 4–3–1 (2–3–1 SIAA)
- Head coach: Elwin W. Midgett (2nd season)
- Captains: Dave Adamson; Billy McDonald
- Home stadium: Horace Jones Field

1941 Southern Intercollegiate Athletic Association football standings
| | Conf. | | | | | Overall |
| Team | W | | L | | T | W | | L | | T |
|---|---|---|---|---|---|---|---|---|---|---|
| Presbyterian $ | 5 | – | 0 | – | 0 | 6 | – | 3 | – | 0 |
| Miami (FL) | 2 | – | 0 | – | 0 | 8 | – | 2 | – | 0 |
| Centre | 2 | – | 0 | – | 0 | 3 | – | 4 | – | 0 |
| Mississippi Southern | 6 | – | 0 | – | 1 | 9 | – | 0 | – | 1 |
| Louisiana Tech | 5 | – | 1 | – | 0 | 5 | – | 4 | – | 1 |
| Eastern Kentucky | 3 | – | 1 | – | 0 | 7 | – | 1 | – | 0 |
| SW Louisiana | 3 | – | 1 | – | 1 | 6 | – | 2 | – | 1 |
| Union (TN) | 3 | – | 1 | – | 1 | 5 | – | 3 | – | 1 |
| Tennessee Tech | 3 | – | 1 | – | 0 | 5 | – | 4 | – | 0 |
| Western Kentucky State Teachers | 3 | – | 1 | – | 1 | 4 | – | 5 | – | 1 |
| Georgetown (KY) | 2 | – | 1 | – | 0 | 7 | – | 2 | – | 0 |
| Wofford | 2 | – | 1 | – | 0 | 4 | – | 6 | – | 0 |
| Memphis State | 3 | – | 2 | – | 0 | 6 | – | 3 | – | 0 |
| Rollins | 2 | – | 2 | – | 0 | 5 | – | 2 | – | 1 |
| Louisiana Normal | 3 | – | 3 | – | 1 | 4 | – | 3 | – | 1 |
| Murray State | 3 | – | 3 | – | 2 | 4 | – | 3 | – | 2 |
| Tampa | 2 | – | 2 | – | 0 | 5 | – | 4 | – | 0 |
| Louisville | 1 | – | 1 | – | 0 | 4 | – | 4 | – | 0 |
| Middle Tennessee State Teachers | 2 | – | 3 | – | 1 | 4 | – | 3 | – | 1 |
| Newberry | 2 | – | 3 | – | 0 | 5 | – | 6 | – | 0 |
| Mississippi College | 1 | – | 2 | – | 0 | 5 | – | 3 | – | 0 |
| SE Louisiana | 2 | – | 4 | – | 0 | 3 | – | 6 | – | 0 |
| Oglethorpe | 1 | – | 3 | – | 0 | 3 | – | 3 | – | 0 |
| Transylvania | 1 | – | 3 | – | 0 | 3 | – | 5 | – | 0 |
| Troy State | 1 | – | 4 | – | 0 | 5 | – | 4 | – | 0 |
| Southeastern Louisiana | 0 | – | 3 | – | 0 | 3 | – | 6 | – | 1 |
| Louisiana College | 1 | – | 5 | – | 0 | 4 | – | 7 | – | 0 |
| Delta State | 1 | – | 7 | – | 1 | 1 | – | 8 | – | 1 |
| Centenary | 0 | – | 1 | – | 1 | 0 | – | 8 | – | 2 |
| Union (KY) | 0 | – | 1 | – | 0 | 0 | – | 5 | – | 0 |
| Morehead State | 0 | – | 3 | – | 0 | 3 | – | 4 | – | 0 |
| Erskine | 0 | – | 4 | – | 0 | 2 | – | 5 | – | 0 |
$ – Conference champion

The 1941 Middle Tennessee State Teachers football team represented the Middle Tennessee State Teachers College (now known as Middle Tennessee State University) as a member of the Southern Intercollegiate Athletic Association (SIAA) during the 1941 college football season. Led by Elwin W. Midgett in his second season as head coach, Middle Tennessee State Teachers compiled an overall record of 4–3–1 with a mark of 2–3–1 in conference play. The team's captains were Dave Adamson and Billy McDonald.

Middle Tennessee was ranked at No. 224 (out of 681 teams) in the final rankings under the Litkenhous Difference by Score System.

== Schedule ==
| Date | Opponent | Site | Result | Source |
|---|---|---|---|---|
| October 3 | Western Kentucky State Teachers | Horace Jones Field; Murfreesboro, TN (rivalry) | L 7–15 | |
| October 10 | Austin Peay* | Horace Jones Field; Murfreesboro, TN | W 28–0 | |
| October 17 | Gordon | Horace Jones Field; Murfreesboro, TN | W 26–0 | |
| October 31 | Memphis State | Horace Jones Field; Murfreesboro, TN | W 13–12 | |
| November 8 | at Delta State | Cleveland, MS | W 26–6 | |
| November 15 | at Murray State | Cutchin Stadium; Murray, KY | L 6–34 | |
| November 20 | Union (TN) | Horace Jones Field; Murfreesboro, TN | T 14–14 | |
| November 27 | at Tennessee Tech | Overhill Field; Cookeville, TN | L 0–6 | |
*Non-conference game
