= 1948 Louisiana Tech Bulldogs football team =

American college football season

1948 Louisiana Tech Bulldogs football
- Conference: Gulf States Conference
- Record: 7–2–1 (4–1 GSC)
- Head coach: Joe Aillet (8th season)
- Captains: Edward Jolly; Jack Kelly
- Home stadium: Tech Stadium

1948 Gulf States Conference football standings
	Conf.					Overall
Team	W		L		T	W		L		T
Mississippi Southern $	4	–	0	–	0	7	–	3	–	0
Louisiana Tech	4	–	1	–	0	7	–	2	–	1
Southwestern Louisiana	3	–	2	–	0	6	–	3	–	1
Northwestern State	2	–	3	–	0	5	–	3	–	1
Louisiana College	1	–	3	–	0	2	–	8	–	0
Southeastern Louisiana	0	–	5	–	0	3	–	6	–	1
$ – Conference champion

The 1948 Louisiana Tech Bulldogs football team was an American football team that represented the Louisiana Polytechnic Institute (now known as Louisiana Tech University) as a member of the Gulf States Conference during the 1948 college football season. In their eighth year under head coach Joe Aillet, the team compiled a 7–2–1 record.

Louisiana Tech was ranked at No. 192 in the final Litkenhous Difference by Score System ratings for 1948.

== Schedule ==
Date	Opponent	Site	Result	Attendance	Source
September 18	Howard Payne*	Tech Stadium; Ruston, LA	W 20–0	5,000	
September 25	Bradley*	Tech Stadium; Ruston, LA	W 17–14	6,500	
October 2	at Auburn*	Auburn Stadium; Auburn, AL	T 13–13	12,000	
October 9	at Houston*	Public School Stadium; Houston, TX	L 33–40	5,000	
October 16	Louisiana College	Tech Stadium; Ruston, LA	W 21–7		
October 23	vs. Northwestern State	State Fair Stadium; Shreveport, LA (rivalry)	W 10–7	12,000	
October 30	at Southwestern Louisiana	McNaspy Stadium; Lafayette, LA (rivalry)	W 24–14		
November 6	Southeastern Louisiana	Tech Stadium; Ruston, LA	W 19–13	6,500	
November 13	at Mississippi Southern	Faulkner Field; Hattiesburg, MS (rivalry)	L 6–20	8,000	
November 25	Memphis State*	Tech Stadium; Ruston, LA	W 20–14	4,000	
*Non-conference game
