= 1947 Centenary Gentlemen football team =

American college football season

1947 Centenary Gentlemen football
- Conference: Louisiana Intercollegiate Conference
- Record: 1–9–1 (1–4 LIC)
- Head coach: Jess Thompson (1st season)
- Home stadium: Fairgrounds Stadium

1947 Louisiana Intercollegiate Conference football standings
	Conf.					Overall
Team	W		L		T	W		L		T
Louisiana Tech $	5	–	0	–	0	5	–	4	–	0
Southwestern Louisiana	4	–	1	–	0	6	–	2	–	0
Northwestern State	3	–	2	–	0	4	–	5	–	0
Southeastern Louisiana	2	–	3	–	0	3	–	5	–	1
Centenary	1	–	4	–	0	1	–	9	–	1
Louisiana College	0	–	4	–	0	1	–	5	–	1
$ – Conference champion

The 1947 Centenary Gentlemen football team was an American football team that represented the Centenary College of Louisiana as a member of the Louisiana Intercollegiate Conference during the 1947 college football season. In their first year under head coach Jess Thompson, the team compiled a 1–9–1 record. In December 1947, the College announced it would no longer provide "football scholarships" and cited financial difficulties of continuing to fund the football program.

In the final Litkenhous Ratings released in mid-December, Centenary was ranked at No. 341 out of 500 college football teams.

== Schedule ==
Date	Opponent	Site	Result	Attendance	Source
September 20	at Houston*	Public School Stadium; Houston, TX	L 7–19	7,000	
September 27	Central State (OK)*	Fairgrounds Stadium; Shreveport, LA	L 7–20	9,000	
October 4	McMurry*	Fairgrounds Stadium; Shreveport, LA	L 12–20	7,500	
October 11	at Memphis State*	Crump Stadium; Memphis, TN	L 7–26	6,000	
October 18	Chattanooga*	Fairgrounds Stadium; Shreveport, LA	L 0–20	9,000	
October 25	at Southeastern Louisiana	Strawberry Stadium; Hammond, LA	L 13–33		
November 1	Louisiana College	Fairgrounds Stadium; Shreveport, LA	W 20–0	4,500	
November 8	Southwestern Louisiana^{†}	Fairgrounds Stadium; Shreveport, LA	L 7–21	7,000	
November 15	at Northwestern State	Demon Stadium; Natchitoches, LA	L 7–22		
November 22	Trinity (TX)*	Fairgrounds Stadium; Shreveport, LA	T 6–6	1,000	
November 27	at Louisiana Tech	Tech Stadium; Ruston, LA	L 14–52	6,000	
*Non-conference game; ^{†}Homecoming
