= 1949 Louisiana Tech Bulldogs football team =

American college football season

1949 Louisiana Tech Bulldogs football

GSC champion
- Conference: Gulf States Conference
- Record: 7–2 (5–0 GSC)
- Head coach: Joe Aillet (9th season)
- Captain: Jimmy Gilbert
- Home stadium: Tech Stadium

1949 Gulf States Conference football standings
	Conf.					Overall
Team	W		L		T	W		L		T
Louisiana Tech $	5	–	0	–	0	7	–	2	–	0
Mississippi Southern	2	–	1	–	0	7	–	3	–	0
Southwestern Louisiana	3	–	2	–	0	6	–	3	–	0
Southeastern Louisiana	1	–	2	–	1	4	–	5	–	1
Northwestern State	1	–	4	–	0	5	–	4	–	0
Louisiana College	0	–	3	–	1	4	–	6	–	1
$ – Conference champion

The 1949 Louisiana Tech Bulldogs football team was an American football team that represented the Louisiana Polytechnic Institute (now known as Louisiana Tech University) as a member of the Gulf States Conference during the 1949 college football season. In their ninth year under head coach Joe Aillet, the team compiled a 7–2 record and as Gulf States Conference champion.

== Schedule ==
Date	Time	Opponent	Site	Result	Attendance	Source
September 17		at Howard Payne*	Lion Stadium; Brownwood, TX	L 19–22		
September 24		at Bradley*	Peoria Stadium; Peoria, IL	L 18–20	5,000	
October 1		Southwestern (TX)*	Tech Stadium; Ruston, LA	W 20–0	5,000	
October 15		at Louisiana College	Alumni Field; Pineville, LA	W 26–7	4,000	
October 22	2:30 p.m.	vs. Northwestern State	State Fair Stadium; Shreveport, LA (rivalry)	W 28–21		
October 29		Southwestern Louisiana	Tech Stadium; Ruston, LA (rivalry)	W 21–0	6,000	
November 5		at Southeastern Louisiana	Strawberry Stadium; Hammond, LA	W 20–14		
November 12		Mississippi Southern	Tech Stadium; Ruston, LA (rivalry)	W 34–13		
November 19		Oklahoma City*	Tech Stadium; Ruston, LA	W 45–0		
*Non-conference game; All times are in Central time
