= 1941 Southwestern Louisiana Bulldogs football team =

American college football season

1941 Southwestern Louisiana Bulldogs football
- Conference: Louisiana Intercollegiate Conference, Southern Intercollegiate Athletic Association
- Record: 6–2–1 (3–1 LIC, 3–1–1 SIAA)
- Head coach: Johnny Cain (5th season)
- Home stadium: McNaspy Stadium

1941 Louisiana Intercollegiate Conference football standings
	Conf.					Overall
Team	W		L		T	W		L		T
Louisiana Tech $	5	–	0	–	0	5	–	4	–	1
Southwestern Louisiana	3	–	1	–	0	6	–	2	–	1
Louisiana Normal	2	–	2	–	1	4	–	3	–	1
Southeastern Louisiana	1	–	3	–	0	4	–	5	–	0
Centenary	0	–	1	–	1	0	–	8	–	2
Louisiana College	0	–	4	–	0	4	–	7	–	0
$ – Conference champion

1941 Southern Intercollegiate Athletic Association football standings
	Conf.					Overall
Team	W		L		T	W		L		T
Presbyterian $	5	–	0	–	0	6	–	3	–	0
Miami (FL)	2	–	0	–	0	8	–	2	–	0
Centre	2	–	0	–	0	3	–	4	–	0
Mississippi Southern	6	–	0	–	1	9	–	0	–	1
Louisiana Tech	5	–	1	–	0	5	–	4	–	1
Eastern Kentucky	3	–	1	–	0	7	–	1	–	0
SW Louisiana	3	–	1	–	1	6	–	2	–	1
Union (TN)	3	–	1	–	1	5	–	3	–	1
Tennessee Tech	3	–	1	–	0	5	–	4	–	0
Western Kentucky State Teachers	3	–	1	–	1	4	–	5	–	1
Georgetown (KY)	2	–	1	–	0	7	–	2	–	0
Wofford	2	–	1	–	0	4	–	6	–	0
Memphis State	3	–	2	–	0	6	–	3	–	0
Rollins	2	–	2	–	0	5	–	2	–	1
Louisiana Normal	3	–	3	–	1	4	–	3	–	1
Murray State	3	–	3	–	2	4	–	3	–	2
Tampa	2	–	2	–	0	5	–	4	–	0
Louisville	1	–	1	–	0	4	–	4	–	0
Middle Tennessee State Teachers	2	–	3	–	1	4	–	3	–	1
Newberry	2	–	3	–	0	5	–	6	–	0
Mississippi College	1	–	2	–	0	5	–	3	–	0
SE Louisiana	2	–	4	–	0	3	–	6	–	0
Oglethorpe	1	–	3	–	0	3	–	3	–	0
Transylvania	1	–	3	–	0	3	–	5	–	0
Troy State	1	–	4	–	0	5	–	4	–	0
Southeastern Louisiana	0	–	3	–	0	3	–	6	–	1
Louisiana College	1	–	5	–	0	4	–	7	–	0
Delta State	1	–	7	–	1	1	–	8	–	1
Centenary	0	–	1	–	1	0	–	8	–	2
Union (KY)	0	–	1	–	0	0	–	5	–	0
Morehead State	0	–	3	–	0	3	–	4	–	0
Erskine	0	–	4	–	0	2	–	5	–	0
$ – Conference champion

The 1941 Southwestern Louisiana Bulldogs football team was an American football team that represented the Southwestern Louisiana Institute of Liberal and Technical Learning (now known as the University of Louisiana at Lafayette) as a member of the Louisiana Intercollegiate Conference (LIC) and the Southern Intercollegiate Athletic Association (SIAA) during the 1941 college football season. In their fifth year under head coach Johnny Cain, the Bulldogs compiled an overall record of 6–2–1 record.

Southwestern Louisiana was ranked at No. 141 (out of 681 teams) in the final rankings under the Litkenhous Difference by Score System for 1941.

== Schedule ==
Date	Opponent	Site	Result	Source
September 19	at Southeastern Louisiana	Strawberry Stadium; Hammond, LA (rivalry)	W 19–7	
September 27	at Alabama*	Denny Stadium; Tuscaloosa, AL	L 6–47	
October 10	Millsaps*	McNaspy Stadium; Lafayette, LA	W 6–0	
October 18	Spring Hill*	McNaspy Stadium; Lafayette, LA	W 39–0	
October 24	Louisiana College	McNaspy Stadium; Lafayette, LA	W 62–0	
October 31	at Louisiana Tech	Tech Stadium; Ruston, LA (rivalry)	L 0–12	
November 7	Stephen F. Austin*	McNaspy Stadium; Lafayette, LA	W 25–0	
November 14	Mississippi Southern	McNaspy Stadium; Lafayette, LA	T 0–0	
November 27	at Louisiana Normal	Demon Stadium; Natchitoches, LA	W 6–0	
*Non-conference game
