= 1941 Louisiana Tech Bulldogs football team =

American college football season

1941 Louisiana Tech Bulldogs football

LIC champion
- Conference: Louisiana Intercollegiate Conference, Southern Intercollegiate Athletic Association
- Record: 5–4–1 (5–0 LIC, 5–1 SIAA)
- Head coach: Joe Aillet (2nd season)
- Captain: Garland Gregory
- Home stadium: Tech Stadium

1941 Louisiana Intercollegiate Conference football standings
	Conf.					Overall
Team	W		L		T	W		L		T
Louisiana Tech $	5	–	0	–	0	5	–	4	–	1
Southwestern Louisiana	3	–	1	–	0	6	–	2	–	1
Louisiana Normal	2	–	2	–	1	4	–	3	–	1
Southeastern Louisiana	1	–	3	–	0	4	–	5	–	0
Centenary	0	–	1	–	1	0	–	8	–	2
Louisiana College	0	–	4	–	0	4	–	7	–	0
$ – Conference champion

1941 Southern Intercollegiate Athletic Association football standings
	Conf.					Overall
Team	W		L		T	W		L		T
Presbyterian $	5	–	0	–	0	6	–	3	–	0
Miami (FL)	2	–	0	–	0	8	–	2	–	0
Centre	2	–	0	–	0	3	–	4	–	0
Mississippi Southern	6	–	0	–	1	9	–	0	–	1
Louisiana Tech	5	–	1	–	0	5	–	4	–	1
Eastern Kentucky	3	–	1	–	0	7	–	1	–	0
SW Louisiana	3	–	1	–	1	6	–	2	–	1
Union (TN)	3	–	1	–	1	5	–	3	–	1
Tennessee Tech	3	–	1	–	0	5	–	4	–	0
Western Kentucky State Teachers	3	–	1	–	1	4	–	5	–	1
Georgetown (KY)	2	–	1	–	0	7	–	2	–	0
Wofford	2	–	1	–	0	4	–	6	–	0
Memphis State	3	–	2	–	0	6	–	3	–	0
Rollins	2	–	2	–	0	5	–	2	–	1
Louisiana Normal	3	–	3	–	1	4	–	3	–	1
Murray State	3	–	3	–	2	4	–	3	–	2
Tampa	2	–	2	–	0	5	–	4	–	0
Louisville	1	–	1	–	0	4	–	4	–	0
Middle Tennessee State Teachers	2	–	3	–	1	4	–	3	–	1
Newberry	2	–	3	–	0	5	–	6	–	0
Mississippi College	1	–	2	–	0	5	–	3	–	0
SE Louisiana	2	–	4	–	0	3	–	6	–	0
Oglethorpe	1	–	3	–	0	3	–	3	–	0
Transylvania	1	–	3	–	0	3	–	5	–	0
Troy State	1	–	4	–	0	5	–	4	–	0
Southeastern Louisiana	0	–	3	–	0	3	–	6	–	1
Louisiana College	1	–	5	–	0	4	–	7	–	0
Delta State	1	–	7	–	1	1	–	8	–	1
Centenary	0	–	1	–	1	0	–	8	–	2
Union (KY)	0	–	1	–	0	0	–	5	–	0
Morehead State	0	–	3	–	0	3	–	4	–	0
Erskine	0	–	4	–	0	2	–	5	–	0
$ – Conference champion

The 1941 Louisiana Tech Bulldogs football team was an American football team that represented the Louisiana Polytechnic Institute (now known as Louisiana Tech University) as a member of the Louisiana Intercollegiate Conference (LIC) and the Southern Intercollegiate Athletic Association (SIAA) during the 1941 college football season. In their second year under head coach Joe Aillet, the team compiled an overall record of 5–4–1 and won the LIC title with a mark of 5–0.

Louisiana Tech was ranked at No. 130 (out of 681 teams) in the final rankings under the Litkenhous Difference by Score System for 1941.

== Schedule ==
Date	Opponent	Site	Result	Attendance	Source
September 20	at LSU*	Tiger Stadium; Baton Rouge, LA	L 0–25	10,000	
September 27	at Texas Mines*	El Paso High School Stadium; El Paso, TX	T 0–0	7,000	
October 3	Mississippi Southern	Tech Stadium; Ruston, LA (Rivalry in Dixie)	L 7–19	6,000	
October 11	at Auburn*	Auburn Stadium; Auburn, AL	L 0–34	8,500	
October 18	vs. Louisiana Normal	State Fair Stadium; Shreveport, LA (rivalry)	W 10–0	8,000	
October 24	at Southeastern Louisiana	Strawberry Stadium; Hammond, LA	W 21–14	5,000	
October 31	Southwestern Louisiana	Tech Stadium; Ruston, LA (rivalry)	W 12–0		
November 8	at Louisiana College	Alumni Field; Pineville, LA	W 45–0		
November 15	Hardin–Simmons*	Tech Stadium; Ruston, LA	L 0–13		
November 27	Centenary	Tech Stadium; Ruston, LA	W 39–7	3,500	
*Non-conference game
