= 1941 Mississippi Southern Southerners football team =

American college football season

1941 Mississippi Southern Southerners football
- Conference: Southern Intercollegiate Athletic Association
- Record: 9–0–1 (5–0–1 SIAA)
- Head coach: Reed Green (5th season)
- Home stadium: Faulkner Field

1941 Southern Intercollegiate Athletic Association football standings
	Conf.					Overall
Team	W		L		T	W		L		T
Presbyterian $	5	–	0	–	0	6	–	3	–	0
Miami (FL)	2	–	0	–	0	8	–	2	–	0
Centre	2	–	0	–	0	3	–	4	–	0
Mississippi Southern	6	–	0	–	1	9	–	0	–	1
Louisiana Tech	5	–	1	–	0	5	–	4	–	1
Eastern Kentucky	3	–	1	–	0	7	–	1	–	0
SW Louisiana	3	–	1	–	1	6	–	2	–	1
Union (TN)	3	–	1	–	1	5	–	3	–	1
Tennessee Tech	3	–	1	–	0	5	–	4	–	0
Western Kentucky State Teachers	3	–	1	–	1	4	–	5	–	1
Georgetown (KY)	2	–	1	–	0	7	–	2	–	0
Wofford	2	–	1	–	0	4	–	6	–	0
Memphis State	3	–	2	–	0	6	–	3	–	0
Rollins	2	–	2	–	0	5	–	2	–	1
Louisiana Normal	3	–	3	–	1	4	–	3	–	1
Murray State	3	–	3	–	2	4	–	3	–	2
Tampa	2	–	2	–	0	5	–	4	–	0
Louisville	1	–	1	–	0	4	–	4	–	0
Middle Tennessee State Teachers	2	–	3	–	1	4	–	3	–	1
Newberry	2	–	3	–	0	5	–	6	–	0
Mississippi College	1	–	2	–	0	5	–	3	–	0
SE Louisiana	2	–	4	–	0	3	–	6	–	0
Oglethorpe	1	–	3	–	0	3	–	3	–	0
Transylvania	1	–	3	–	0	3	–	5	–	0
Troy State	1	–	4	–	0	5	–	4	–	0
Southeastern Louisiana	0	–	3	–	0	3	–	6	–	1
Louisiana College	1	–	5	–	0	4	–	7	–	0
Delta State	1	–	7	–	1	1	–	8	–	1
Centenary	0	–	1	–	1	0	–	8	–	2
Union (KY)	0	–	1	–	0	0	–	5	–	0
Morehead State	0	–	3	–	0	3	–	4	–	0
Erskine	0	–	4	–	0	2	–	5	–	0
$ – Conference champion

The 1941 Mississippi Southern Southerners football team was an American football team that represented Mississippi Southern College (now known as the University of Southern Mississippi) as a member of the Southern Intercollegiate Athletic Association during the 1941 college football season. In their fifth year under head coach Reed Green, the team compiled a 9–0–1 record.

== Schedule ==
Date	Opponent	Site	Result	Attendance	Source
September 27	Georgia Teachers*	Faulkner Field; Hattiesburg, MS	W 70–0		
October 3	at Louisiana Tech	Tech Stadium; Ruston, LA (rivalry)	W 19–7	6,000	
October 10	Southeastern Louisiana	Faulkner Field; Hattiesburg, MS	W 43–6	8,000	
October 17	Millsaps*	Faulkner Field; Hattiesburg, MS	W 20–0	10,000	
October 24	at Spring Hill*	Dorn Stadium; Mobile, AL	W 26–7		
November 1	Louisiana College^{†}	Faulkner Field; Hattiesburg, MS	W 13–6		
November 7	Louisiana Normal	Faulkner Field; Hattiesburg, MS	W 21–7	2,500	
November 14	at Southwestern Louisiana	McNaspy Stadium; Lafayette, LA	T 0–0		
November 21	at Delta State	Delta Field; Cleveland, MS	W 27–7		
November 29	at St. Mary's (TX)*	Alamo Stadium; San Antonio, TX	W 7–0		
*Non-conference game; ^{†}Homecoming
