= Southeastern Louisiana Lions football, 1940–1949 =

American college football seasons

The Southeastern Louisiana Lions football program, 1940–1949 represented Southeastern Louisiana College (now known as Southeastern Louisiana University) as a member of the Louisiana Intercollegiate Conference (LIC) and Gulf States Conference (GSC) during the decade of the 1940s. During this time, the Lions were led by four different head coaches and had an overall record for the decade of 31–32–4. During this decade, the Lions played their home games on campus at Strawberry Stadium in Hammond, Louisiana.

From 1940 to 1947 the Lions competed as a member of the LIC, with the exception of 1943 to 1945 when the program was on hiatus during World War II. Between 1940 and 1942, Southeastern was led by three coaches: Lloyd Stovall, Jesse Fatherree, and Arthur Morton. Under this trio of coaches, the Lions had an overall record of 12–16–1. After the War, Ned McGehee served as head coach through the end of the decade. He led Southeastern to an undefeated season and LIC championship in 1946 and to an overall record of 19–16–3 for the rest of the decade. After the LIC disbanded after the 1947 season, Southeastern joined the GSC and remained a member of the conference through their 1970 season.

== 1940 ==
1940 Southeastern Louisiana Lions football
- Conference: Louisiana Intercollegiate Conference
- Record: 3–6–1 (0–3 LIC)
- Head coach: Lloyd Stovall (3rd season)
- Home stadium: Strawberry Stadium

1940 Louisiana Intercollegiate Conference football standings
	Conf.					Overall
Team	W		L		T	W		L		T
Southwestern Louisiana $	4	–	0	–	0	6	–	3	–	1
Louisiana Normal	3	–	1	–	1	6	–	3	–	1
Louisiana Tech	3	–	2	–	0	6	–	4	–	0
Louisiana College	0	–	2	–	1	2	–	5	–	2
Centenary	0	–	2	–	0	3	–	7	–	0
Southeastern Louisiana	0	–	3	–	0	3	–	6	–	1
$ – Conference champion

The 1940 Southeastern Louisiana Lions football team was an American football team that represented Southeastern Louisiana College (now known as Southeastern Louisiana University) as a member of the Louisiana Intercollegiate Conference (LIC) during the 1940 college football season. In their third year under head coach Lloyd Stovall, the team compiled an overall record of 3–6–1 with a mark of 0–3 in conference play, and finished sixth in the LIC. Southeastern Louisiana played their home games on campus at Strawberry Stadium in Hammond, Louisiana.

In March 1941 Stovall resigned as head coach to become the head of the physical education department and athletic director at Southeastern.

Schedule

Date	Opponent	Site	Result	Source
September 14	St. Mary's (TX)*	Strawberry Stadium; Hammond, LA	L 6–27	
September 20	at Southwestern Louisiana	McNaspy Stadium; Lafayette, LA (rivalry)	L 0–7	
September 27	Livingston State*	Strawberry Stadium; Hammond, LA	W 19–0	
October 4	at Louisiana Normal	Demon Stadium; Natchitoches, LA (rivalry)	L 0–32	
October 11	Mississippi Southern*	Strawberry Stadium; Hammond, LA	L 6–13	
October 17	vs. Sam Houston State*	Purple Stadium; Beaumont, TX	L 12–22	
October 26	at Pensacola Navy*	Air Station Field; Pensacola, FL	T 7–7	
November 11	Murray State (OK)*^{†}	Strawberry Stadium; Hammond, LA	W 41–0	
November 15	at Louisiana Tech	Tech Stadium; Ruston, LA	L 6–26	
November 21	at Northeast Center*	Brown Field; Monroe, LA	W 20–13	
*Non-conference game; ^{†}Homecoming

== 1941 ==
1941 Southeastern Louisiana Lions football
- Conference: Louisiana Intercollegiate Conference
- Record: 4–5 (1–3 LIC)
- Head coach: Jesse Fatherree (1st season)
- Home stadium: Strawberry Stadium

1941 Louisiana Intercollegiate Conference football standings
	Conf.					Overall
Team	W		L		T	W		L		T
Louisiana Tech $	5	–	0	–	0	5	–	4	–	1
Southwestern Louisiana	3	–	1	–	0	6	–	2	–	1
Louisiana Normal	2	–	2	–	1	4	–	3	–	1
Southeastern Louisiana	1	–	3	–	0	4	–	5	–	0
Centenary	0	–	1	–	1	0	–	8	–	2
Louisiana College	0	–	4	–	0	4	–	7	–	0
$ – Conference champion

The 1941 Southeastern Louisiana Lions football team was an American football team that represented Southeastern Louisiana College (now known as Southeastern Louisiana University) as a member of the Louisiana Intercollegiate Conference (LIC) during the 1941 college football season. In their first year under head coach Jesse Fatherree, the team compiled an overall record of 4–5 with a mark of 1–3 in conference play, and finished fourth in the LIC. Southeastern Louisiana played their home games on campus at Strawberry Stadium in Hammond, Louisiana.

Southeastern Louisiana was ranked at No. 322 (out of 681 teams) in the final rankings under the Litkenhous Difference by Score System for 1941.

In March 1941 Fatherree was hires as head coach at Southeastern after Lloyd Stovall resigned to become the head of the physical education department and athletic director at the college. Prior to becoming head coach, Fatherree had served as an assistant at Southeastern since 1938. Fatherree resigned as head coach after a single season in August 1942 to become the backfield coach at LSU.

Schedule

Date	Opponent	Site	Result	Attendance	Source
September 19	Southwestern Louisiana	Strawberry Stadium; Hammond, LA (rivalry)	L 7–19		
September 27	at St. Mary's (TX)*	Alamo Stadium; San Antonio, TX	L 0–38	2,000	
October 10	at Mississippi Southern*	Faulkner Field; Hattiesburg, MS	L 6–43	8,000	
October 17	Livingston State*	Strawberry Stadium; Hammond, LA	W 34–7		
October 24	Louisiana Tech	Strawberry Stadium; Hammond, LA	L 14–21	5,000	
October 31	Louisiana Normal	Strawberry Stadium; Hammond, LA (rivalry)	L 0–6	3,000	
November 15	Northeast Center*	Strawberry Stadium; Hammond, LA	W 7–6		
November 21	at Louisiana College	Alumni Field; Pineville, LA	W 14–10		
November 28	Delta State*	Strawberry Stadium; Hammond, LA	W 32–14		
*Non-conference game

== 1942 ==
1942 Southeastern Louisiana Lions football
- Conference: Louisiana Intercollegiate Conference
- Record: 5–5 (0–3 LIC)
- Head coach: Arthur Morton (1st season)
- Home stadium: Strawberry Stadium

1942 Louisiana Intercollegiate Conference football standings
	Conf.					Overall
Team	W		L		T	W		L		T
Louisiana Normal $	3	–	0	–	0	6	–	2	–	0
Southwestern Louisiana	2	–	1	–	0	3	–	4	–	0
Louisiana Tech	1	–	2	–	0	6	–	3	–	0
Southeastern Louisiana	0	–	3	–	0	5	–	5	–	0
$ – Conference champion

The 1942 Southeastern Louisiana Lions football team was an American football team that represented Southeastern Louisiana College (now known as Southeastern Louisiana University) as a member of the Louisiana Intercollegiate Conference (LIC) during the 1942 college football season. In their first year under head coach Arthur Morton, the team compiled an overall record of 5–5 with a mark of 0–3 in conference play, and finished fourth in the LIC. Southeastern Louisiana played their home games on campus at Strawberry Stadium in Hammond, Louisiana.

Southeastern Louisiana was ranked at No. 228 (out of 590 college and military teams) in the final rankings under the Litkenhous Difference by Score System for 1942.

In August 1942, Morton was hired as head coach after the resignation of Jesse Fatherree. Prior to becoming head coach at Southeastern, Morton was head coach at Bogalusa High School from 1939 to 1941. After a single season as head coach, Morton was granted a leave of absence to take a position at Louisiana State Normal School in their physical education department, affiliated with the Navy.

Schedule

Date	Opponent	Site	Result	Attendance	Source
September 18	East Central*	Strawberry Stadium; Hammond, LA	W 39–0		
September 26	at Pensacola Navy*	Air Station Field; Pensacola, FL	L 0–13		
October 9	at Southwestern Louisiana	McNaspy Stadium; Lafayette, LA (rivalry)	L 13–35		
October 17	at Camp Beauregard*	Bolton Stadium; Alexandria, LA	W 53–0		
October 24	at Northeast Center*	Brown Field; Monroe, LA	L 0–13		
October 30	at Louisiana Normal	Demon Stadium; Natchitoches, LA (rivalry)	L 6–7		
November 7	at Louisiana Tech	Tech Stadium; Ruston, LA	L 14–56		
November 13	Memphis State*	Strawberry Stadium; Hammond, LA	W 38–14	2,500	
November 20	Lamar*	Strawberry Stadium; Hammond, LA	W 34–7		
November 27	Troy State*	Strawberry Stadium; Hammond, LA	W 45–7		
*Non-conference game

== 1943–1945 ==
Football was discontinued from 1943 to 1945 as a result of World War II.

== 1946 ==
1946 Southeastern Louisiana Lions football

LIC champion Burley Bowl champion

Burley Bowl, W 21–13 vs. Milligan
- Conference: Louisiana Intercollegiate Conference
- Record: 9–0 (4–0 LIC)
- Head coach: Ned McGehee (1st season)
- Home stadium: Strawberry Stadium

1946 Louisiana Intercollegiate Conference football standings
	Conf.					Overall
Team	W		L		T	W		L		T
Southeastern Louisiana $	4	–	0	–	0	9	–	0	–	0
Louisiana Tech	3	–	1	–	0	7	–	3	–	0
Southwestern Louisiana	2	–	2	–	0	6	–	4	–	0
Northwestern State	1	–	3	–	0	4	–	6	–	0
Louisiana College	0	–	4	–	0	1	–	8	–	0
$ – Conference champion

The 1946 Southeastern Louisiana Lions football team was an American football team that represented Southeastern Louisiana College (now known as Southeastern Louisiana University) as a member of the Louisiana Intercollegiate Conference (LIC) during the 1946 college football season. In their first year under head coach Ned McGehee, the Lions compiled a 9–0 record, won the LIC championship, defeated Milligan in the second annual Burley Bowl game, and outscored opponents by a total of 236 to 46.

Southeastern Louisians ranked eighth nationally among small-college teams with an average of 298.4 yards per game in total offense. It also ranked ninth nationally in total defense, giving up an average of only 142.7 yards per game. Southeastern Louisiana was ranked at No. 87 in the final Litkenhous Difference by Score System rankings for 1946.

The team featured two brothers from Massachusetts, Albert and Louis Romboli, playing at the halfback position.

During the fall of 1946, there were over 1,000 persons enrolled at Southeastern Louisiana, of which 70% were men. The football team had over 50 players.

Schedule

Date	Opponent	Site	Result	Attendance	Source
September 27	Louisiana College*	Strawberry Stadium; Hammond, LA	W 18–0		
October 4	Southwestern Louisiana	Strawberry Stadium; Hammond, LA (rivalry)	W 27–13		
October 11	Merchant Marine-Pass Christian*	Strawberry Stadium; Hammond, LA	W 61–6		
October 18	Northwestern State	Strawberry Stadium; Hammond, LA (rivalry)	W 13–0		
October 26	at Mississippi College*	Provine Field; Clinton, MS	W 14–0		
November 9	at Louisiana Tech	Tech Stadium; Ruston, LA	W 22–14	4,000	
November 15	Jacksonville State*	Strawberry Stadium; Hammond, LA	W 39–0		
November 22	at Mississippi Southern*	Faulkner Field; Hattiesburg, MS	W 20–0		
November 28	vs. Milligan*	Memorial Stadium; Johnson City, TN (Burley Bowl)	W 21–13	7,500	
*Non-conference game

== 1947 ==
1947 Southeastern Louisiana Lions football
- Conference: Louisiana Intercollegiate Conference
- Record: 3–5–1 (2–3 LIC)
- Head coach: Ned McGehee (2nd season)
- Home stadium: Strawberry Stadium

1947 Louisiana Intercollegiate Conference football standings
	Conf.					Overall
Team	W		L		T	W		L		T
Louisiana Tech $	5	–	0	–	0	5	–	4	–	0
Southwestern Louisiana	4	–	1	–	0	6	–	2	–	0
Northwestern State	3	–	2	–	0	4	–	5	–	0
Southeastern Louisiana	2	–	3	–	0	3	–	5	–	1
Centenary	1	–	4	–	0	1	–	9	–	1
Louisiana College	0	–	4	–	0	1	–	5	–	1
$ – Conference champion

The 1947 Southeastern Louisiana Lions football team was an American football team that represented Southeastern Louisiana College (now known as Southeastern Louisiana University) as a member of the Louisiana Intercollegiate Conference (LIC) during the 1947 college football season. In their second year under head coach Ned McGehee, the team compiled an overall record of 3–5–1 with a mark of 2–3 in conference play, and finished fourth in the LIC. Southeastern Louisiana played their home games on campus at Strawberry Stadium in Hammond, Louisiana.

Southeastern Louisiana was ranked at No. 214 (out of 500 college football teams) in the final Litkenhous Ratings for 1947.

Schedule

Date	Opponent	Site	Result	Attendance	Source
September 13	at Milligan*	Roosevelt Stadium; Johnson City, TN	T 6–6	7,000	
September 27	vs. Louisiana College	Bolton Stadium; Alexandria, LA	W 26–2		
October 4	at Southwestern Louisiana	McNaspy Stadium; Lafayette, LA (rivalry)	L 7–40	10,000	
October 17	at Northwestern State	Demon Stadium; Natchitoches, LA (rivalry)	L 12–14		
October 25	Centenary	Strawberry Stadium; Hammond, LA	W 33–13		
November 8	Louisiana Tech	Strawberry Stadium; Hammond, LA	L 18–20		
November 14	Louisville*	Strawberry Stadium; Hammond, LA	L 0–23		
November 22	vs. Eastern Kentucky*	Tiger Stadium; Baton Rouge, LA	W 30–6	500	
November 27	Mississippi Southern*	Strawberry Stadium; Hammond, LA	L 0–35		
*Non-conference game

== 1948 ==
1948 Southeastern Louisiana Lions football
- Conference: Gulf States Conference
- Record: 3–6–1 (0–5 GSC)
- Head coach: Ned McGehee (3rd season)
- Home stadium: Strawberry Stadium

1948 Gulf States Conference football standings
	Conf.					Overall
Team	W		L		T	W		L		T
Mississippi Southern $	4	–	0	–	0	7	–	3	–	0
Louisiana Tech	4	–	1	–	0	7	–	2	–	1
Southwestern Louisiana	3	–	2	–	0	6	–	3	–	1
Northwestern State	2	–	3	–	0	5	–	3	–	1
Louisiana College	1	–	3	–	0	2	–	8	–	0
Southeastern Louisiana	0	–	5	–	0	3	–	6	–	1
$ – Conference champion

The 1948 Southeastern Louisiana Lions football team was an American football team that represented Southeastern Louisiana College (now known as Southeastern Louisiana University) as a member of the Gulf States Conference (GSC) during the 1948 college football season. In their third year under head coach Ned McGehee, the team compiled an overall record of 3–6–1 with a mark of 0–5 in conference play, and finished sixth in the GSC. Southeastern Louisiana played their home games on campus at Strawberry Stadium in Hammond, Louisiana.

Schedule

Date	Opponent	Site	Result	Attendance	Source
September 17	Livingston State*	Strawberry Stadium; Hammond, LA	W 7–0		
September 25	Louisiana College	Strawberry Stadium; Hammond, LA	L 8–14		
September 30	vs. Milligan*	City Park Stadium; New Orleans, LA	W 14–0		
October 8	Southwestern Louisiana	Strawberry Stadium; Hammond, LA (rivalry)	L 12–19		
October 15	Northwestern State^{†}	Strawberry Stadium; Hammond, LA (rivalry)	L 0–49		
October 23	at Eglin Army Airfield*	Valparaiso, FL	W 28–6		
November 6	at Louisiana Tech	Tech Stadium; Ruston, LA	L 13–19	6,500	
November 11	vs. Jacksonville State*	Murphree Stadium; Gadsden, AL	T 7–7		
November 19	at Mississippi Southern	Faulkner Field; Hattiesburg, MS	L 0–27		
November 24	Eastern Kentucky*	Strawberry Stadium; Hammond, LA	L 7–26	3,000	
*Non-conference game; ^{†}Homecoming

== 1949 ==
1949 Southeastern Louisiana Lions football
- Conference: Gulf States Conference
- Record: 4–5–1 (1–2–1 GSC)
- Head coach: Ned McGehee (4th season)
- Home stadium: Strawberry Stadium

1949 Gulf States Conference football standings
	Conf.					Overall
Team	W		L		T	W		L		T
Louisiana Tech $	5	–	0	–	0	7	–	2	–	0
Mississippi Southern	2	–	1	–	0	7	–	3	–	0
Southwestern Louisiana	3	–	2	–	0	6	–	3	–	0
Southeastern Louisiana	1	–	2	–	1	4	–	5	–	1
Northwestern State	1	–	4	–	0	5	–	4	–	0
Louisiana College	0	–	3	–	1	4	–	6	–	1
$ – Conference champion

The 1949 Southeastern Louisiana Lions football team was an American football team that represented Southeastern Louisiana College (now known as Southeastern Louisiana University) as a member of the Gulf States Conference (GSC) during the 1949 college football season. In their fourth year under head coach Ned McGehee, the team compiled an overall record of 4–5–1 with a mark of 1–2–1 in conference play, and finished fourth in the GSC. Southeastern Louisiana played their home games on campus at Strawberry Stadium in Hammond, Louisiana.

Schedule

Date	Time	Opponent	Site	Result	Attendance	Source
September 17	8:00 p.m.	Livingston State*	Strawberry Stadium; Hammond, LA	W 41–12		
September 25		at Louisiana College	Alumni Stadium; Pineville, LA	T 0–0	4,000	
October 1		Southwestern Louisiana	Strawberry Stadium; Hammond, LA (rivalry)	L 20–27		
October 8		at No. 4 Tulane*	Tulane Stadium; New Orleans, LA	L 0–40	18,000	
October 15		at Northwestern State	Demon Stadium; Natchitoches, LA (rivalry)	W 25–13		
October 29		Pensacola Navy*	Strawberry Stadium; Hammond, LA	W 14–0		
November 5		Louisiana Tech	Strawberry Stadium; Hammond, LA	L 14–20		
November 12		Jacksonville State*	Strawberry Stadium; Hammond, LA	W 20–14		
November 19		at No. 13 LSU*	Tiger Stadium; Baton Rouge, LA	L 7–48	19,000	
November 23		at Delta State*	Delta Field; Cleveland, MS	L 7–19		
*Non-conference game; Rankings from AP Poll released prior to the game; All times are in Central time
