= Boston College Eagles football =

Football team for Boston College

2026 Boston College Eagles football team
- First season: 1893; 133 years ago
- Athletic director: Blake James
- General manager: Vacant
- Head coach: Bill O'Brien; 3rd season, 13–20 (.394)
- Location: Chestnut Hill, Massachusetts
- Stadium: Alumni Stadium (capacity: 44,500)
- NCAA division: Division I FBS
- Conference: ACC
- Nickname: Eagles
- Colors: Maroon and gold
- All-time record: 703–541–37 (.563)
- Bowl record: 15–14 (.517)

National championships
- Claimed: 1940

Conference championships
- Big East: 2004

Division championships
- ACC Atlantic: 2005, 2007, 2008
- Heisman winners: Doug Flutie – 1984
- Consensus All-Americans: 13
- Rivalries: Notre Dame (rivalry); Syracuse (rivalry); Clemson (rivalry); Virginia Tech (rivalry); UMass (rivalry); Holy Cross (rivalry)

Uniforms
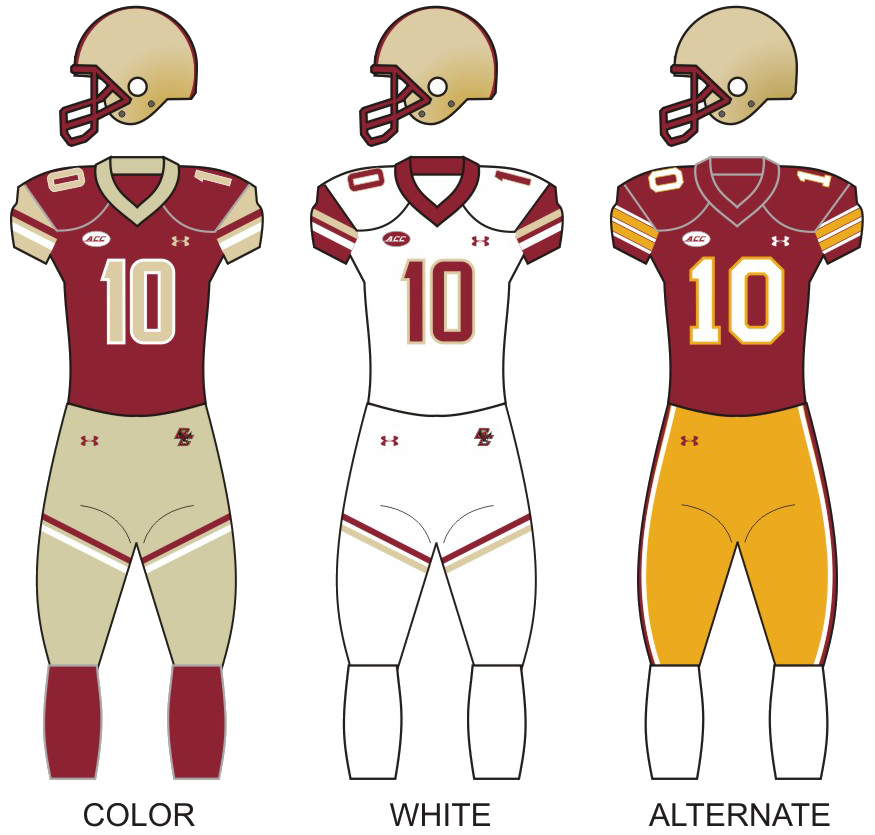
- Fight song: "For Boston"
- Mascot: Baldwin the Eagle
- Marching band: "Screaming Eagles" Marching Band
- Outfitter: New Balance
- Website: bceagles.com

The Boston College Eagles football team represents Boston College in the sport of American football. The Eagles compete in the NCAA Division I Football Bowl Subdivision (FBS) of the National Collegiate Athletic Association (NCAA) as a member of the Atlantic Coast Conference (ACC). The Eagles home games are played at Alumni Stadium on the university's campus in Chestnut Hill, Massachusetts.

Formed in 1892, Boston College has won four Eastern championships in 1940, 1942, 1983, and 1984 when most Division I FBS schools in the Northeast and Mid-Atlantic regions remained independent, and one co–Big East championship in 2004. BC claims one national championship in 1940, though the NCAA doesn't recognize it. The program has amassed over 700 wins, and has a 15–13 record in postseason bowl games, most notably the 1941 Sugar Bowl and 1985 Cotton Bowl. Boston College has produced a Heisman Trophy winner (Doug Flutie in 1984), 13 consensus All-Americans, and over 200 NFL players. Boston College has had eight members inducted into the College Football Hall of Fame, and three inductees into the Pro Football Hall of Fame: Art Donovan, Ernie Stautner, and Luke Kuechly.

Boston College is one of only two Catholic universities that field a team in the Football Bowl Subdivision, the other being Notre Dame. In addition to success on the gridiron, Boston College football teams are consistently ranked among the nation's best for academic achievement and graduation. In 2005, 2006, and 2007, the football team's Academic Progress Rate was the highest of any school that finished the season ranked in the AP or ESPN/USA Today Coaches' polls.

Boston College is the only FBS school in Massachusetts and in New England to compete in one of the Power Four conferences. The Eagles are currently coached by Bill O'Brien, who formerly served as head coach for Penn State and as offensive coordinator at Alabama as well as the NFL's New England Patriots.

== History ==
=== Early history (1893–1938) ===
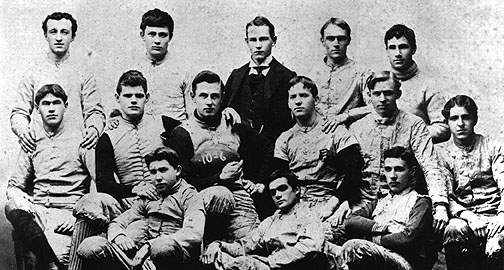
Boston College football team, 1893.

In 1892, Boston College President Edward Ignatius Devitt, S.J., grudgingly agreed to the requests of two undergraduates, Joseph F. O'Connell of the class of 1893 and Joseph Drum of the class of 1894, to start a varsity football team. Drum would become the first head coach, albeit an unpaid position and O'Connell was captain. On October 26, 1893, BC played its first official game against the St. John's Literary Institute of Cambridge followed by its first intercollegiate game against MIT. BC won the first game 4–0, but lost 6–0 to MIT. Some of the original team's alumni had particularly significant careers: Joseph F. O'Connell was elected to the U.S. House of Representatives from Massachusetts, and running back James Carlin became president of the College of the Holy Cross.

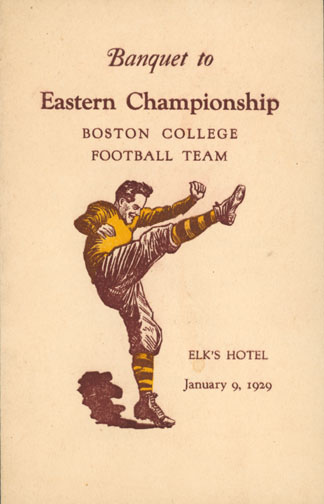
Program for a banquet to celebrate the 1928 Eastern championship

In 1920, the Boston College football team adopted the nickname 'Eagles.' The season was capped by a stirring 14–0 victory over Holy Cross before 40,000 fans at Braves Field. The win gave the team a perfect 8–0 season and the school's first undefeated season. Eagles coach Frank Cavanaugh, coach from 1919 through 1926, was later inducted into the College Football Hall of Fame. Hall of Fame coach Gil Dobie was Boston College head coach from 1936 through 1938.

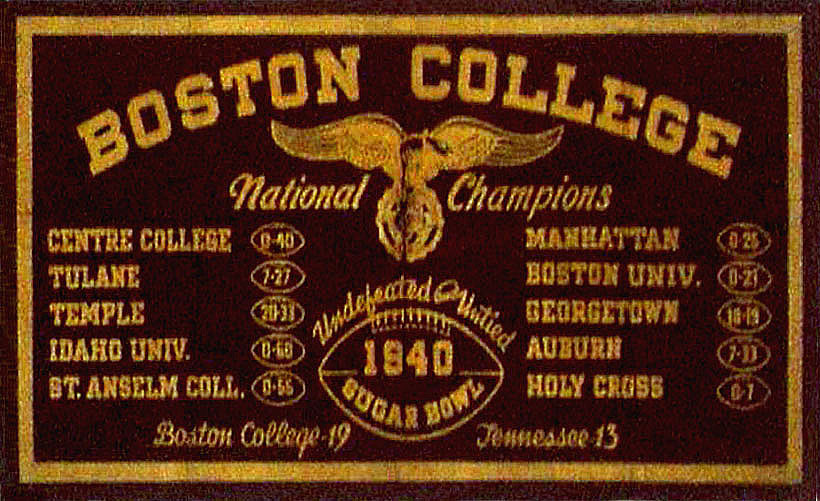
1940 banner

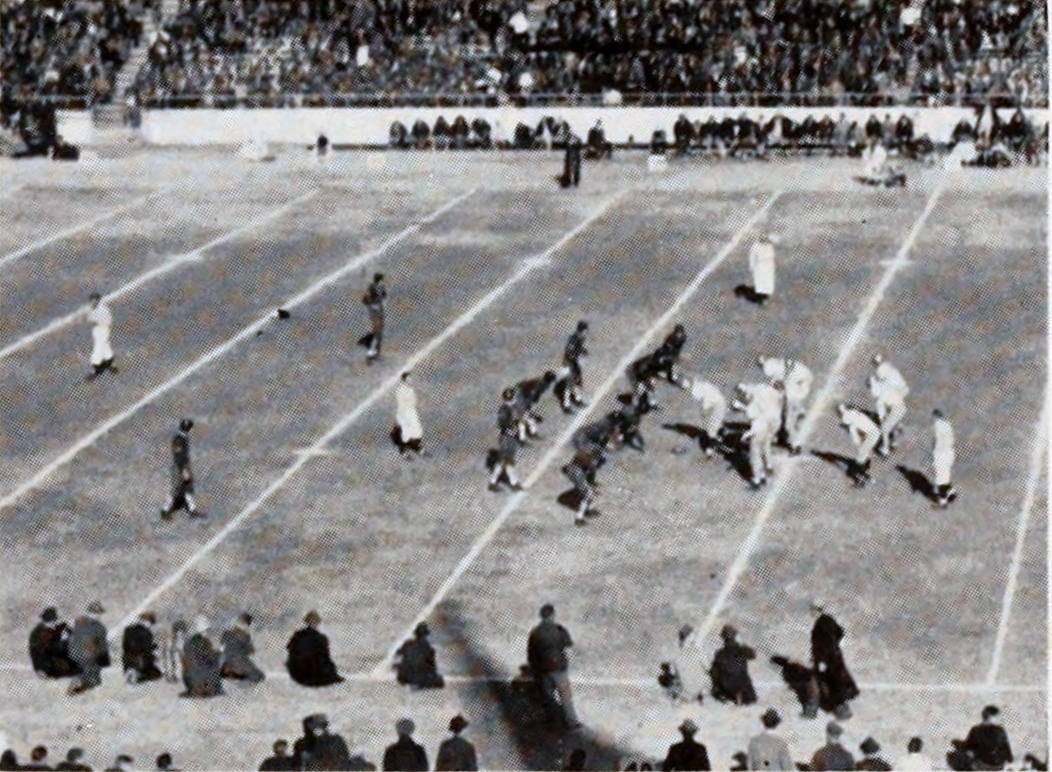
Clemson and Boston College line up in the 1940 Cotton Bowl

=== Frank Leahy era (1939–1940) ===
The 1939 Boston College team, led by first-year head coach Frank Leahy, finished the regular season with a 9–1 record, and the Eagles were ranked in the final AP Poll for the first time in school history, at No. 11. They were invited to the school's first bowl game, the 1940 Cotton Bowl Classic in Dallas, where they lost to Clemson, 3–6.

The 1940 season can arguably be called the greatest year in the history of Boston College football. BC finished the regular season at 10–0 and then captured the 1941 Sugar Bowl championship, earning the nickname "Team of Destiny". A 19–18 victory over No. 9 Georgetown, played before 41,700 fans at sold-out Fenway Park in mid-November, was called one of the greatest games ever by famed sportswriter Grantland Rice. Going into the game, the Hoyas had 22 consecutive victories spanning three seasons. BC trailed until the third quarter, when a 43-yard touchdown pass from Charlie O'Rourke to Monk Maznicki put the Eagles ahead. With just seconds remaining, BC had the ball on their own nine, fourth down and 18 to go. Georgetown set up to return the Eagles' punt. Instead of punting, O'Rourke scrambled in his own end zone for 45 seconds then took a safety. BC used the free kick to boot the ball far downfield and dashed the Hoyas' three-season unbeaten record.

Coach Leahy, who would later cement his legendary status during an eleven-year stint as head coach at Notre Dame, took his undefeated Eagles on to the Sugar Bowl in New Orleans where they beat No. 4 Tennessee, 19–13. Tied 13–13 in the fourth quarter, Tennessee's Bob Foxx missed a short field goal attempt with three minutes remaining, and Boston College took over on its own 20–yard line. Quarterback Charlie O'Rourke led the Eagles on an eighty-yard drive, capped with his 24-yard touchdown run to seal the victory.

Five members of the storied 1940 team have been inducted into the College Football Hall of Fame: receiver Gene Goodreault (50); guard George Kerr (47); center Chet Gladchuk (45); fullback Mike Holovak (12); and halfback / quarterback Charlie O'Rourke (13). Due to racial segregation policies of the era, halfback Lou Montgomery, the first Black athlete in the history of Boston College, was forced to sit out both the 1940 Cotton Bowl and the 1941 Sugar Bowl.

A banner on the BC campus commemorating the 1940 team uses the phrase "national champions". However, Boston College was not awarded a national championship in any of the contemporary 1940 college football rankings, which concluded in early December, before the season's bowl games. Although BC's claim to a title is not recognized by the NCAA or college football historians in general, the College Football Data Warehouse website claims that two selectors (Cliff Morgan and Ray Bryne) rated BC at No. 1 for the 1940 season. The website states that BC's historic run resulted in a split championship with Minnesota, but it's not clear whether the selectors awarded BC a title contemporarily or retroactively. The NCAA lists only Minnesota (ranked at No. 1 in the final AP Poll of early December) as the national champion for 1940, and does not credit Boston College with any national championships in football.

=== Denny Myers era (1941–1950) ===
In 1941, Denny Myers was hired as head coach after Leahy left to become head coach at rival Notre Dame.

In 1942, Boston College won its first 8 games of the season, climbing to No. 1 in the AP Poll. All the Eagles needed to do to secure its first ever AP national championship was to beat rival Holy Cross (4–4–1) in the final game of the regular season. The result, however, was a stunning rout loss, 12–55. The Eagles team canceled their planned post-game celebration at the Cocoanut Grove nightclub in Boston, which inadvertently saved the team from perishing along with 492 others in the Cocoanut Grove fire that occurred that night. Finishing No. 8 in the final AP rankings, the Eagles received an invitation to play in the Orange Bowl on New Year's Day. All-American fullback Mike Holovak scored three rushing touchdowns, but Boston College ultimately lost to No. 10 Alabama, 21–37.

=== Mike Holovak era (1951–1959) ===
Mike Holovak was named head coach of BC in 1951. During his tenure as head coach, the Eagles compiled a 49–29–3 record. Holovak won Coach of the Year honors in 1954 from New England football writers. Those efforts were good enough to earn him a new four-year contract on November 22, 1955, but even after four more winning seasons - he was fired on December 3, 1959, after a year in which Eagle fans had subjected him to constant verbal abuse. Holovak would move on to coach the Boston Patriots in the upstart American Football League (AFL) from 1961 to 1968.

=== Ernie Hefferle era (1960–1961) ===
Ernie Hefferle, an assistant coach for the NFL's Washington Redskins, was hired as head coach of the Eagles following Holovak's firing. Hefferle's Eagles compiled a record of 7–12–1 in two seasons. However, mounting pressure to win from the alumni and administration led to Hefferle's resignation after the 1961 season.

=== Jim Miller era (1962–1967) ===
BC hired Jim Miller away from Detroit as its head coach in January 1962. Under Miller, the Eagles compiled a record of 34–24 that included four winning seasons in those six years. Miller resigned after the 1967 season.

=== Joe Yukica era (1968–1977) ===
New Hampshire head coach Joe Yukica was hired to replace Miller at BC. Yukica's Eagles compiled a 68–37 record, which included eight winning seasons. Yukica left BC after the 1977 season to accept the head football coach position at Dartmouth. One of the highlights during Yukica 's tenure was an upset win over No. 7 Texas to open the 1976 season.

=== Ed Chlebek era (1978–1980) ===
The Eagles hired Ed Chlebek away from Eastern Michigan to lead its football program in January 1978. Despite a dismal 0–11 record in Chlebek's first season, BC rebounded to compile a 5–6 record in 1979 and a 7–4 record in 1980, leading to a job offer from Kent State to Chlebek, which he accepted. Chlebek's final record at BC is 12–21.

=== Jack Bicknell era (1981–1990) ===
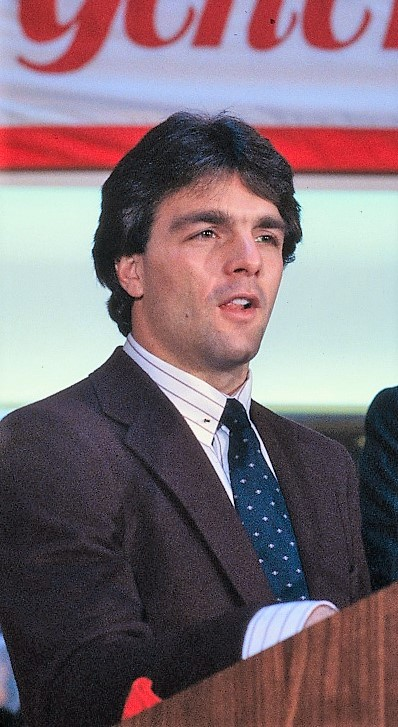
QB Doug Flutie was the winner of the Heisman Trophy in 1984

Jack Bicknell was hired as BC's head coach after previously serving as head coach at Maine. The best player for the Eagles during Bicknell's tenure was quarterback Doug Flutie (of Natick, Massachusetts), who played for Boston College from 1981 to 1984. Flutie won the Heisman Trophy in his senior year. He left school as the NCAA's all-time passing yardage leader with 10,579 yards and was a unanimous All-American. Bicknell's final record at Boston College was 59–55–1, took the Eagles to four bowl games, and won the Lambert-Meadowlands Trophy (awarded to the 'Eastern champion' in Division I FBS) twice: 1983 and 1984. He was fired after the 1990 season.

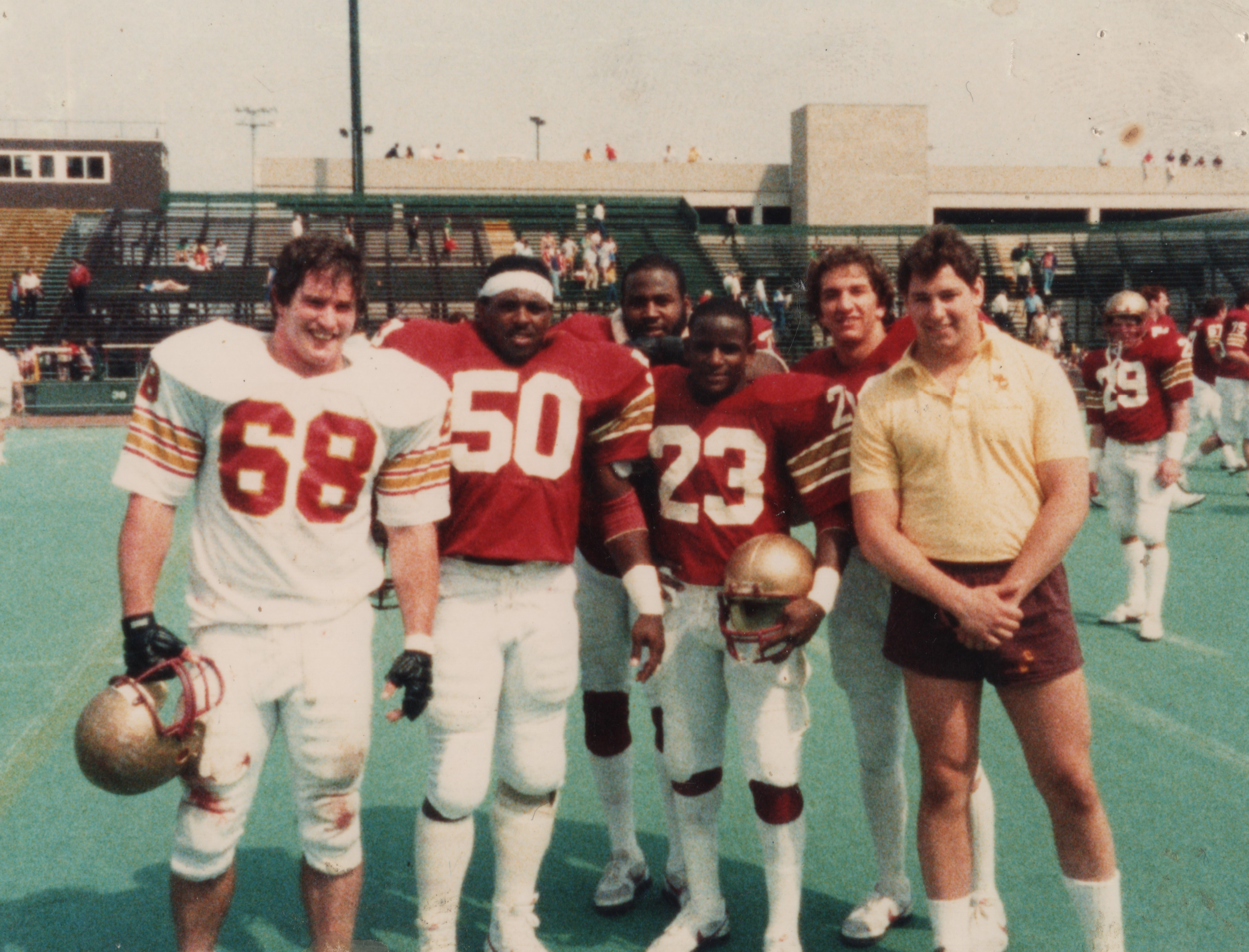
Boston College players at the 1984 Spring Game at Alumni Stadium

The Eagles completed the 1984 season with a 10–2 record, finishing at No. 5 in the AP Poll and No. 4 in the Coaches' Poll. They defeated the SWC champion Houston Cougars in the 1985 Cotton Bowl, 45–28. Fullback Steve Strachan (of Burlington, Massachusetts) was named the game's MVP. He had 23 carries for 91 yards and two touchdowns. Running back Troy Stradford rushed for 196 yards, and sealed the game with an 18-yard touchdown run with 1:06 left in the fourth quarter as the Eagles clinched their first major bowl victory since the 1941 Sugar Bowl.

Boston College began the 1984 season with a 7–2 record, posting victories over No. 9 Alabama 38–31 and North Carolina 52–20. Heading into the November 23, 1984 matchup against defending national champion No. 12 Miami (led by star QB Bernie Kosar), quarterback Doug Flutie gained national attention when he led the Eagles to victory in a high-scoring, back-and-forth game in the Orange Bowl. The game was nationally televised on CBS the day after Thanksgiving, and had a huge audience. Miami staged a dramatic drive to take the lead, 45–41, in the closing minute of the game. Boston College then took possession at their own 22-yard line with 28 seconds to go. After two passes moved the ball another 30 yards, only six seconds remained on the clock. On the last play of the game, Flutie rolled out right away from the defense and threw a Hail Mary pass that was caught in the end zone by senior wide receiver Gerard Phelan, giving BC a miraculous 47–45 win. A persistent urban legend holds that this play essentially clinched the Heisman Trophy, the award given to the best player in college football that year, for Flutie; in fact, the Heisman voting was already complete by the day of the game. It has been called "the greatest moment in college football." In November 2008, Doug Flutie was honored by Boston College with a statue of his famous "Hail Mary" pass. The Eagles finished the regular season with a 45–10 victory over rival Holy Cross.

=== Tom Coughlin era (1991–1993) ===
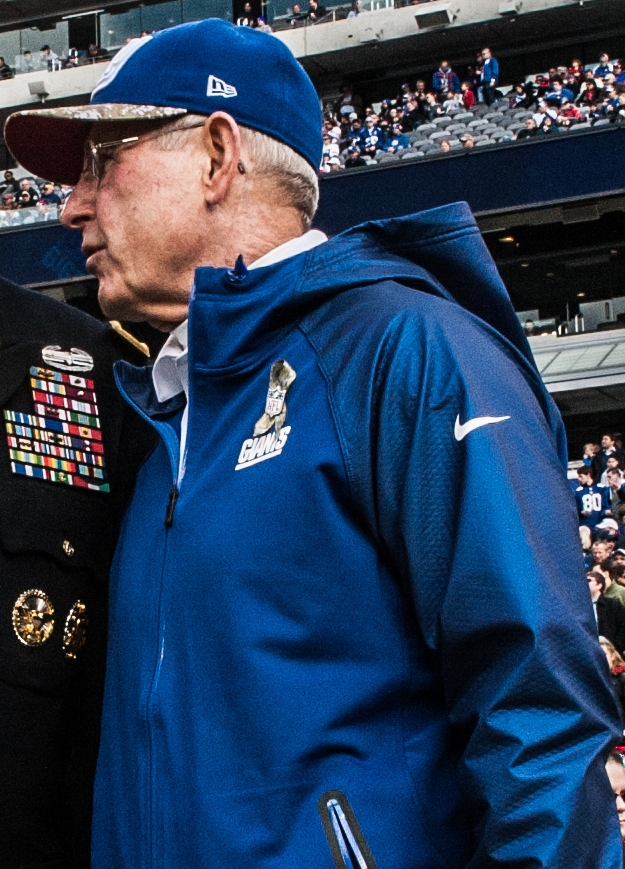
Coach Tom Coughlin

Tom Coughlin, wide receivers coach for the NFL's New York Giants and former BC quarterbacks coach (1981–83), was hired as BC's head coach after Bicknell was fired. Coughlin's Eagles compiled a record of 21–13–1. The highlight of Coughlin's tenure was a 41–39 Eagles victory over No. 1 Notre Dame in 1993, the first time the Eagles had ever defeated the Fighting Irish and the first and only time in program history that the Eagles had defeated a No. 1 team. Coughlin, who left BC for the NFL's Jacksonville Jaguars, would go on to become head coach of the New York Giants, winning two Super Bowls: XLII, XLVI (both against the New England Patriots).

=== Dan Henning era (1994–1996) ===
BC hired Dan Henning, formerly offensive coordinator for the NFL's Detroit Lions, as its head coach in March 1994. Henning's tenure is remembered for a scandal that occurred during the 1996 season. On October 26, 1996, the Eagles were routed 45–17 by Syracuse. Following the game, Henning heard that some players might have bet against their own team. He informed the appropriate university officials. As a result, 13 players were suspended for the rest of the season and six were banned permanently. As a result of the scandal and a mediocre 16–19–1 record as coach, Henning resigned at the end of the 1996 season.

=== Tom O'Brien era (1997–2006) ===
3× Pro Bowl QB Matt Hasselbeck (who grew up in Westwood, Massachusetts) played for BC from 1994 to 1997

In December 1996, BC hired Virginia offensive coordinator Tom O'Brien. With good recruiting skills and a strong coaching staff around him, notably offensive coordinator Dana Bible and defensive coordinator Frank Spaziani, O'Brien turned the program into a consistent top-25 team. The team was also helped by increased exposure on the national stage due to the move to the Atlantic Coast Conference (ACC) and, later, improved facilities in the form of the Yawkey Center. BC won eight straight postseason bowl games, the first six under O'Brien, between 2000 and 2008.

The 2001 season was a satisfying one for O'Brien as the Eagles finished 8–4 and ranked in the top 25 in both major polls, capped by a 20–16 win over SEC powerhouse Georgia in the Music City Bowl. A 21–17 victory over Notre Dame gave the Eagles two wins in three years against their archrivals. Boston College gave eventual national champion (No. 1) Miami by far its biggest scare of the entire season at Alumni Stadium as the Hurricanes were able to pull out a victory only in the final seconds 18–7. Running back William Green rushed for 1,559 yards and was the second-leading rusher in the country and a consensus first-team All-America pick. Green (16th, Cleveland Browns) and offensive tackle Marc Colombo (29th, Chicago Bears) were selected in the first round of the NFL draft, the first time two BC players were picked in the first round.

2004 would be Boston College's final campaign in the Big East, and it finished the season in a four-way tie atop the league after losing the home finale to Syracuse (thus costing the Eagles a coveted berth in a BCS bowl) — a year in which they closed the season ranked No. 21 in both major polls.

=== Jeff Jagodzinski era (2007–2008) ===
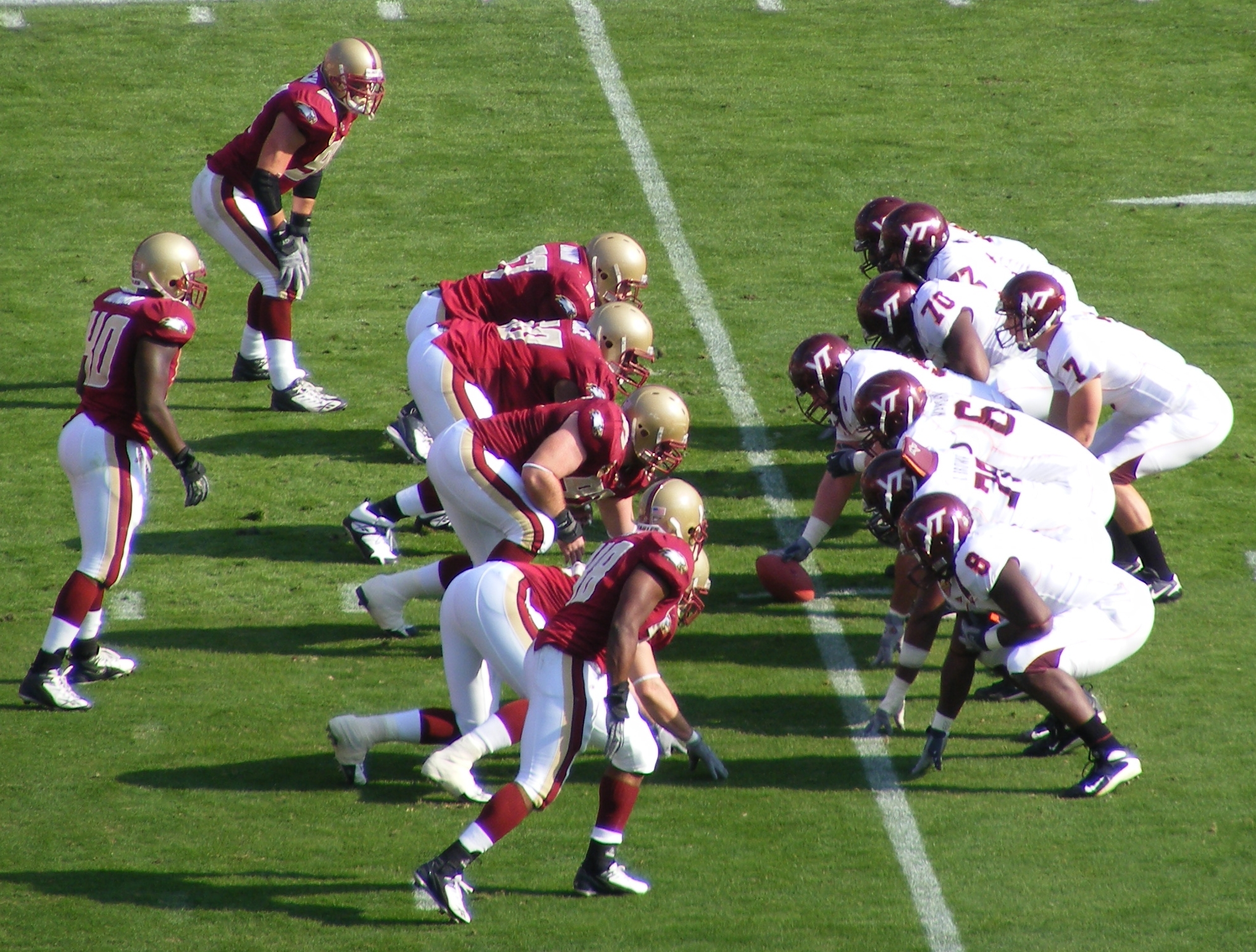
Boston College playing defense against Virginia Tech in the 2008 ACC Championship Game

O'Brien was replaced by then Green Bay Packers offensive coordinator Jeff Jagodzinski. He inherited a talent laden BC team, which he led to an 11–3 record, a No. 10 finish in the polls and an ACC Atlantic Division Championship. At one point in the season, the Eagles were ranked No. 2 in the AP Poll and BCS standings. Along with Steve Logan, Jagodzinski brought a high flying offensive attack which was very different from Tom O'Brien's short passing game style. He has been nicknamed "Jags" by BC fans and the media. After his first season at BC, Tom O'Brien protegees Matt Ryan and Gosder Cherilus were selected in the first round of the NFL draft. In both 2007 and 2008, the Eagles lost the ACC Championship Game to Virginia Tech.

Following the 2008 season, Jagodzinski interviewed for the vacant New York Jets head coaching job, despite being warned not to do so by athletic director Gene DeFilippo. He interviewed for the position, and was fired the next day. He only completed two years of his five-year contract with Boston College. The Jets ultimately hired Rex Ryan.

=== Frank Spaziani era (2009–2012) ===
Defensive coordinator Frank Spaziani was hired as BC's head coach in January 2009. Prior to the 2009 season, linebacker and reigning ACC Defensive Player of the Year Mark Herzlich was diagnosed with Ewing's Sarcoma, a rare form of bone cancer. Herzlich was forced to miss the entirety of the 2009 season. Herzlich became an inspirational figure as he battled his way back, earning the Disney's Wide World of Sports Spirit Award, an award presented annually to college football's most inspirational player or team. Boston College created a chapter of Uplifting Athletes to benefit Ewing sarcoma research. The chapter participates in an annual "Lift for Life" (where players compete in various physical challenges) to raise money. On October 3, 2009, Herzlich publicly announced on College Gameday that he was cancer-free. Herzlich completed the comeback when he took the field once again on September 4, 2010, against Weber State.

In 2011, the Eagles finished 4–8 and failed to qualify for a bowl for the first time in 12 years. Following the 2011 season, junior LB Luke Kuechly won the Butkus Award, the Lombardi Award, the Lott Trophy, and the Bronko Nagurski Trophy; the first Eagle to win these awards. Spaziani was fired on November 25, 2012, following a season in which Boston College went 2–10, the worst record since 1978.

=== Steve Addazio era (2013–2019) ===
Spaziani was replaced by Temple head coach Steve Addazio.

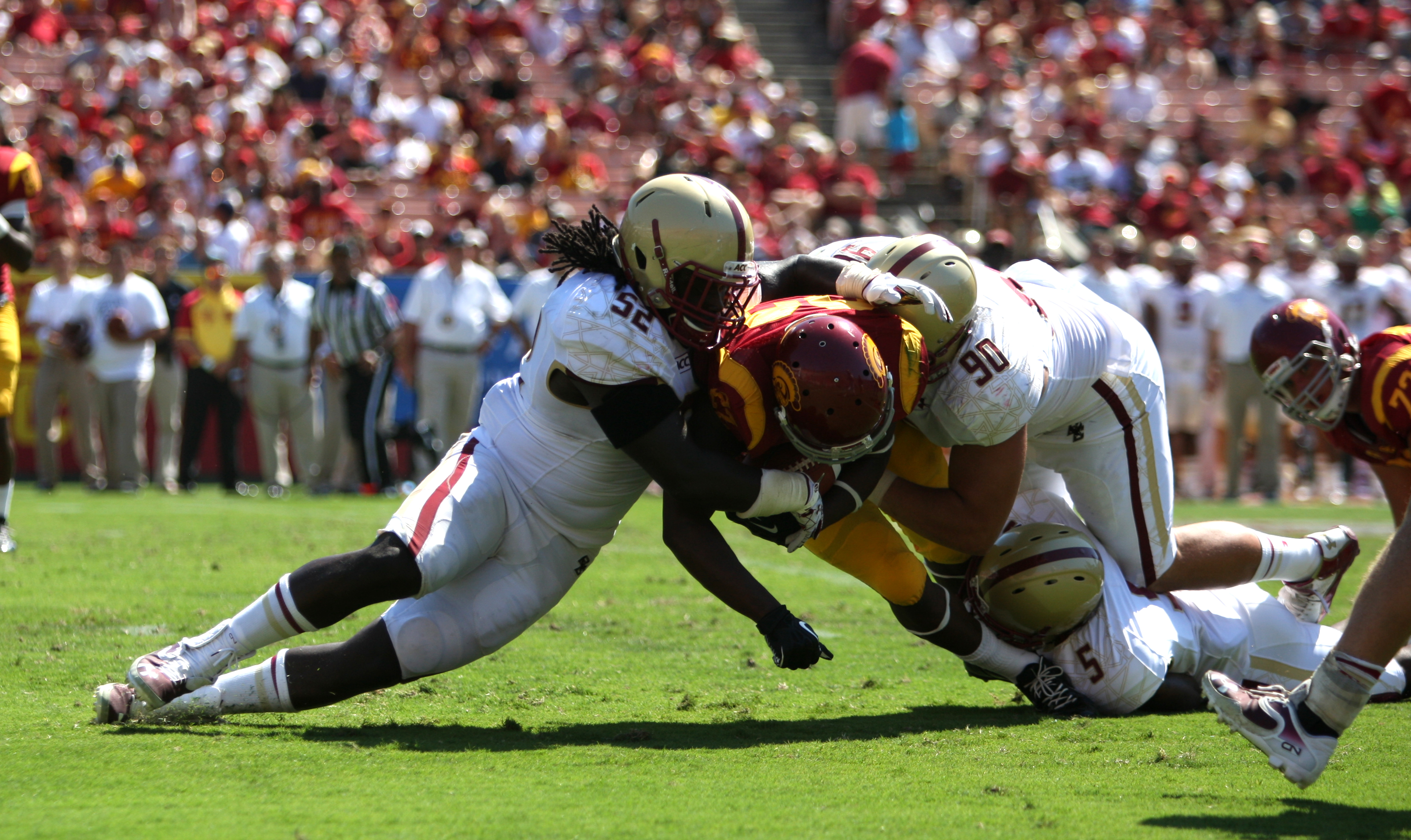
Boston College defenders combine to bring down a USC ball-carrier during a September 2013 game at the Los Angeles Coliseum

Following a dismal 2–10 season under Spaziani, Addazio made an immediate impact in his first year as head coach. The team improved to 7–6 and secured a bowl appearance in the Independence Bowl; the program's first since 2010.

The feature component of Addazio's run-heavy offense, senior running back Andre Williams emerged as a standout player and rushed for 2,177 yards on the year. The mark earned him a top-10 spot on the all-time NCAA record list for most rushing yards in a season, and the Doak Walker Award as the best running back in the country. Williams finished 4th place in the Heisman Trophy voting and was also a Walter Camp Award finalist.

Boston College fired Addazio on December 1, 2019, after a 6–6 season and a 44–44 record over 7 seasons. The lone highlight of the 2019 season was running-back A. J. Dillon achieving a school record for career rushing yards at 4,382 in just three seasons.

=== Jeff Hafley era (2020–2023) ===
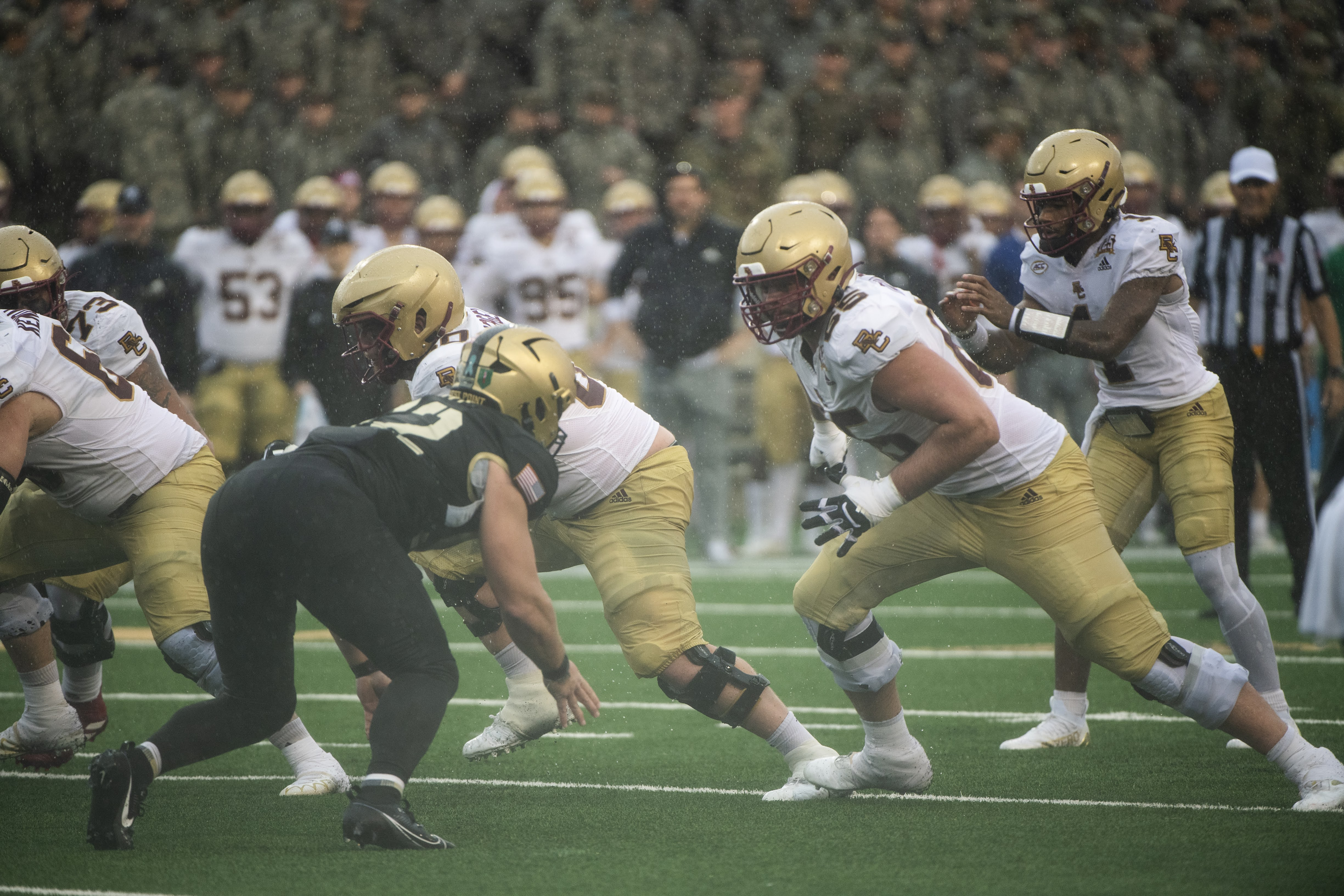
Eagles quarterback Tommy Castellanos prepares to receive a snap during a 2023 game at Michie Stadium

On December 13, 2019, Jeff Hafley was hired to be the head coach at Boston College. During his four years with the team, Hafley led the Eagles to a 22–26 overall record and three bowl game invitations, appearing in only the 2023 Fenway Bowl, where they defeated #17 SMU, 23–14. The Green Bay Packers hired Hafley as their defensive coordinator on January 31, 2024.

=== Bill O'Brien era (2024–present) ===
On February 9, 2024, Boston College hired Andover, Massachusetts native Bill O'Brien, who formerly served as offensive coordinator at Alabama and for the New England Patriots.

== Conference affiliations ==
- Independent (1892–1972)
- Division I Independent (1973–1977)
- Division I-A Independent (1978–1990)
- Big East Conference (1991–2004)
- Atlantic Coast Conference (2005–present)

== Championships ==
=== National championships ===
Perhaps the best football team in Boston College history, the undefeated 1940 Eagles (11–0) won the 1941 Sugar Bowl over previously unbeaten No. 4 Tennessee. The school claims this year as a national championship. However, the team was not chosen by any NCAA-designated "major selectors" of national championships and does not appear in the NCAA records book.

Year	Coach	Selectors	Record	Bowl	Opponent	Result	Final AP	Final Coaches'
1940	Frank Leahy	Self-claimed	11–0	Sugar Bowl	Tennessee	W 19–13	No. 5	−

=== Conference championships ===
For much of its history, Boston College played as an independent, as did the majority of what are now labeled as Division I FBS football-playing schools located in the Northeast and Mid-Atlantic regions. During this time, Eastern Championships were named by independent third-party selectors and awarded of various trophies. The process of picking an Eastern Champion eventually came to be symbolized by the Lambert-Meadowlands Trophy awarded by the New Jersey Sports and Exposition Authority beginning in 1936. As a result, the Lambert-Meadowlands Trophy, voted on by a panel of sports writers in New York, became the de facto conference championship for those schools.

==== Eastern championships ====
Year	Conference	Trophy	Coach	Overall record	Bowl	Final AP	Final Coaches'
1940	Independent	Lambert-Meadowlands Trophy (Eastern championship)	Frank Leahy	11–0	W Sugar	No. 5	–
1942	Independent	Lambert-Meadowlands Trophy (Eastern championship)	Denny Myers	8–2	L Orange	No. 8	–
1983	Independent	Lambert-Meadowlands Trophy (Eastern championship)	Jack Bicknell	9–3	L Liberty	No. 19	No. 20
1984	Independent	Lambert-Meadowlands Trophy (Eastern championship)	Jack Bicknell	10–2	W Cotton	No. 5	No. 4

In 1991, the majority of football independents in the East (including Boston College) aligned themselves together in the Big East Football Conference. The Big East first crowned an official champion in 1993. The Eagles left the Big East and joined the Atlantic Coast Conference (ACC) in 2005.

==== Big East championships ====
Year	Conference	Coach	Overall record	Conference record	Final AP	Final Coaches'
2004†	Big East Conference	Tom O'Brien	9–3	4–2	No. 21	No. 21

† Co-champions

=== Division championships ===
Divisional play began in the Atlantic Coast Conference at the start of the 2005 football season following BC's inclusion in the conference. BC earned a share of the ACC Atlantic Division title in 2005 and in 2008. Florida State represented the division in the inaugural ACC Championship Game by virtue of the head-to-head tiebreaker in 2005, while BC represented the Atlantic in 2008.

Game	Division	Coach	Overall record	Conference record	Opponent	CG Result
2005†	ACC Atlantic	Tom O'Brien	9–3	5–3	N/A Lost tiebreaker to Florida State	
2007	ACC Atlantic	Jeff Jagodzinski	11–3	6–2	Virginia Tech	L 16–30
2008†	ACC Atlantic	Jeff Jagodzinski	9–5	5–3	Virginia Tech	L 12–30

† Co-champions

== Bowl games ==
Boston College has been to 27 bowl games, holding a 14–12 record (the 2018 First Responder Bowl started but was delayed in the first quarter and ultimately canceled). Additionally, they accepted an invitation to the 2021 Military Bowl, however it was cancelled the day before it was set to be played due to COVID-19 cases in the Boston College program. The Eagles posted an 8-game bowl winning streak from 2000 to 2007 and went to 12 consecutive bowl games from 1999 to 2010. BC's 8-game bowl win streak was the nation's longest active streak before it was snapped in 2008. The 12-year streak was tied with Oklahoma for the 6th longest active streak in country. The Eagles recently broke their 5 bowl-game losing streak in 2016 with a 36–30 victory over former ACC foe Maryland.

== Head coaches ==
Years	Coach	Record	Pct.
1893	Joseph Drum	3–3	.500
1894	William Nagle	1–6	.143
1895	Joseph Lawless	2–4–2	.250
1896	Frank Carney	5–3	.625
1897–1899, 1901	John Dunlop	15–17–2	.441
1902	Arthur White	0–7–1	.000
1908	Joe Reilly & Joe Kenney	2–4–2	.250
1909	Thomas H. Maguire	3–4–1	.375
1910	Hub Hart	0–4–2	.000
1911	Joseph Courtney	0–7	.000
1912–1913	William Joy	6–7–2	.400
1914–1915	Stephen Mahoney	8–8	.500
1916–1917	Charles Brickley	12–4	.750
1918	Frank Morrissey	5–2	.714
1919–1926	Frank Cavanaugh	48–14–5	.716
1927	D. Leo Daley	4–4	.500
1928–1934	Joe McKenney	44–18–3	.677
1935	Dinny McNamara / Harry Downes	3–1 / 3–2	.667
1936–1938	Gil Dobie	16–6–5	.593
1939–1940	Frank Leahy	20–2	.909
1941–1942	Denny Myers	35–27–4	.530
1943–1945	Moody Sarno	11–7–1	.579
1946–1950	Denny Myers	35–27–4	.530
1951–1959	Mike Holovak	49–29–3	.605
1960–1961	Ernie Hefferle	7–12–1	.350
1962–1967	Jim Miller	34–24	.586
1968–1977	Joe Yukica	68–37	.648
1978–1980	Ed Chlebek	12–21	.364
1981–1990	Jack Bicknell	59–55–1	.513
1991–1993	Tom Coughlin	21–13–1	.600
1994–1996	Dan Henning	16–19–1	.444
1997–2006	Tom O'Brien	75–45	.625
2006	Frank Spaziani (interim)	1–0	1.000
2007–2008	Jeff Jagodzinski	20–8	.714
2009–2012	Frank Spaziani	21–29	.420
2013–2019	Steve Addazio	44–44	.500
2019	Rich Gunnell (interim)	0–1	.000
2020–2023	Jeff Hafley	22–26	.458
2024–present	Bill O'Brien	9–16	.360

Ref.:

== Alumni Stadium ==
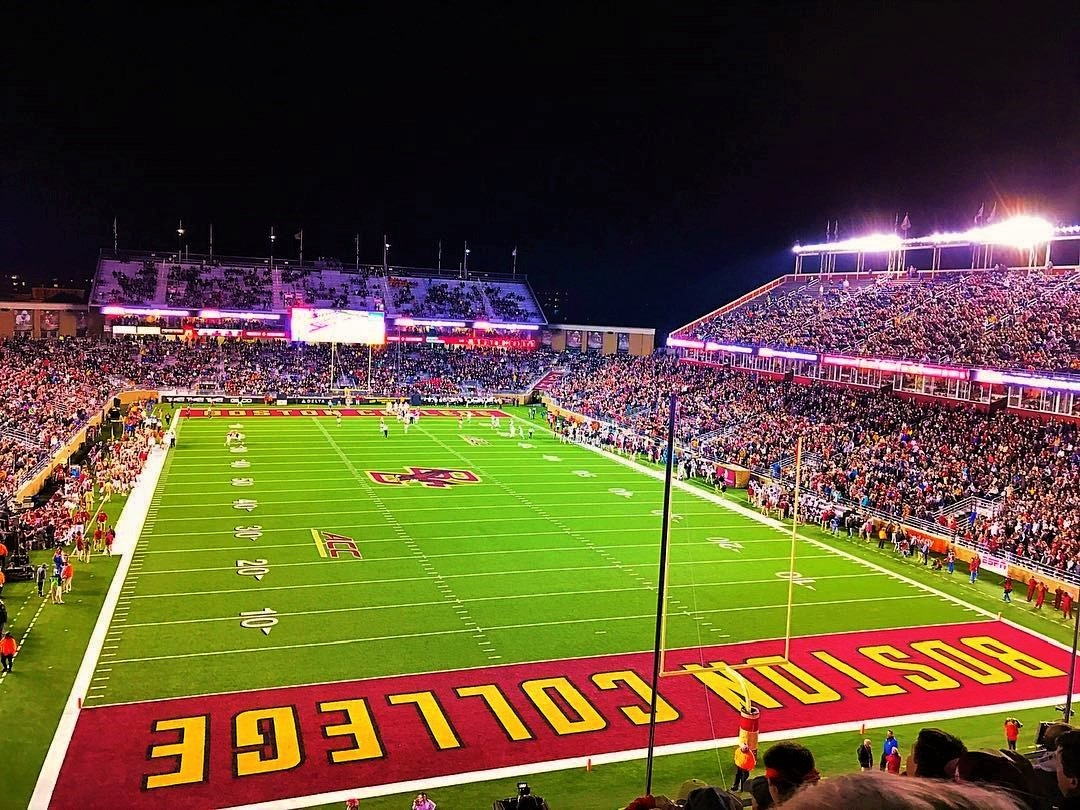
Alumni Stadium

Since 1957, Alumni Stadium in Chestnut Hill, Massachusetts has been the home of the Eagles. Located on BC's lower campus, the stadium has a capacity of 44,500. Prior to 1957, the Eagles played home games at Boston's Fenway Park and Braves Field.

In 2005, the Yawkey Athletics Center was constructed at the north end-zone side of the stadium. The Yawkey Center houses the football offices and weight room. A replica of Doug Flutie's 1984 Heisman Trophy is on display in the BC football museum on the first floor of the center.

== Rivalries ==
=== Clemson ===
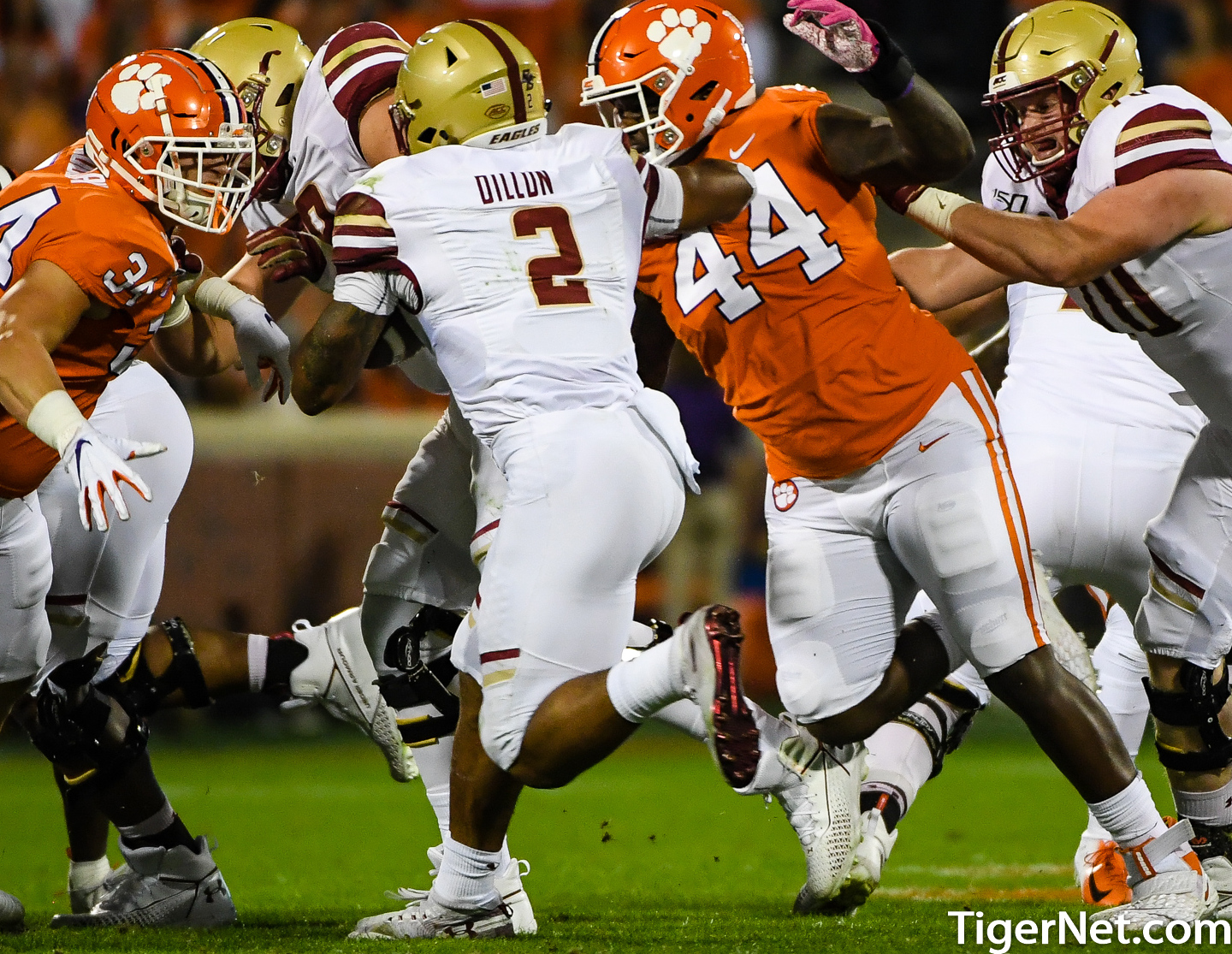
A. J. Dillon on a running play in a 2019 matchup with Clemson

The Eagles and Clemson Tigers first played each other in the Cotton Bowl at the end of the 1939 season, a game won by the Tigers. The schools played 11 more times until 1960. When BC joined the ACC in 2005, the games between the Eagles and the Tigers were especially memorable. Both the 2005 and 2006 games went to overtime and the 2007 game featured late-game heroics from Matt Ryan in a division-clinching victory.

Starting in 2008, the Boston College Gridiron Club created the O'Rourke-McFadden Trophy to honor the friendly rivalry between the Eagles and the Tigers. The trophy is named after BC's Charlie O'Rourke and Clemson's Banks McFadden, star players of their respective teams when the Eagles and Tigers first played in the 1940 Cotton Bowl. The MVP of the game receives a replica leather helmet. Montel Harris was named the MVP of the 2010 meeting.

Clemson leads the all-time series 20–9–2 as of the 2021 season.

=== Holy Cross ===
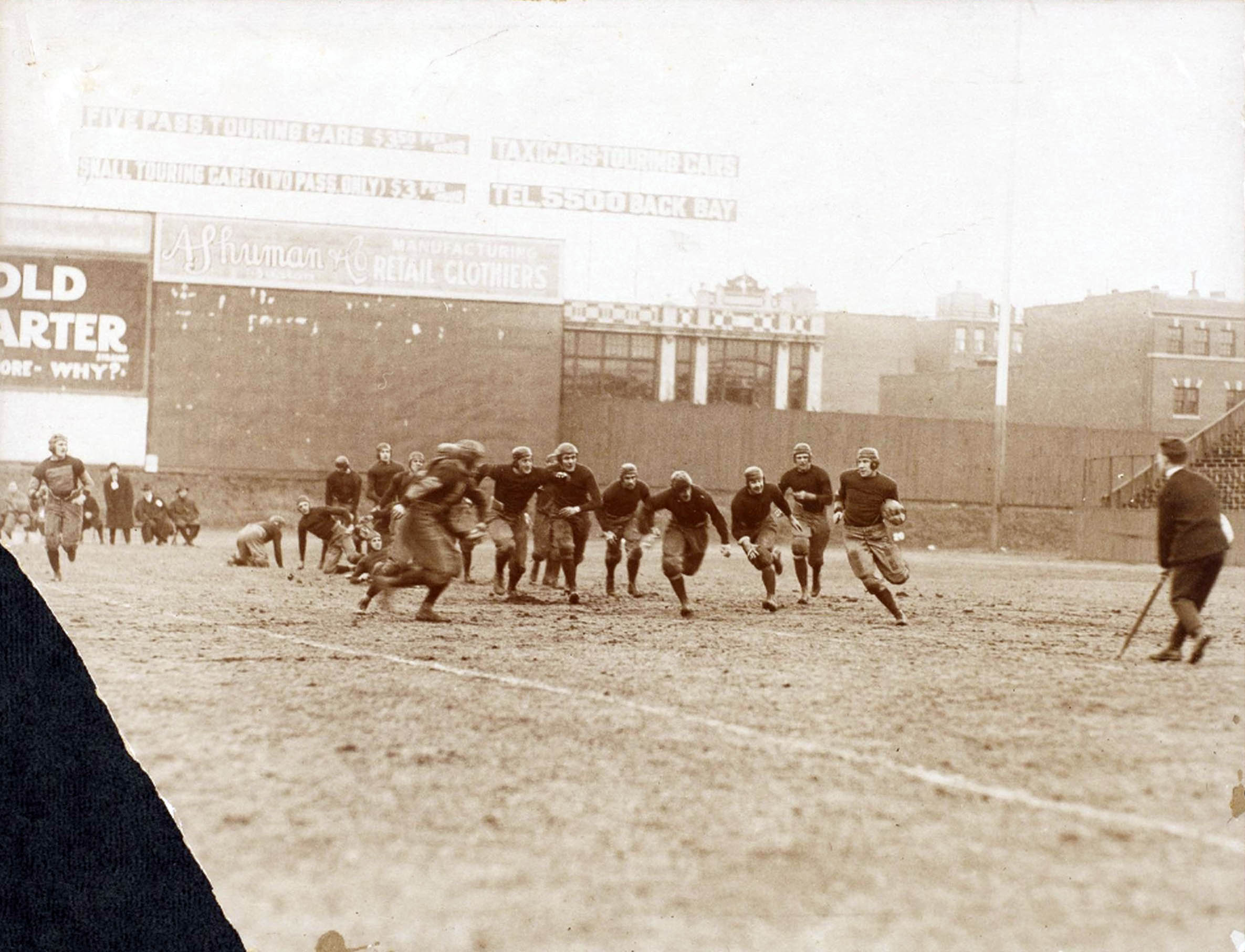
Holy Cross takes on Boston College in 1916 at Fenway Park. BC won the game, 17–14.

Boston College and Holy Cross have a dormant rivalry dating back to 1896, and have met 83 times on the field. The game was an annual home-and-home series until 1986. The Eagles dominated the last two decades of the annual series, winning 17 out of 19 meetings from 1967 to 1986. The rivalry was recently renewed in 2018 as the Eagles handily won a 62–14 victory at Chestnut Hill; a 2020 matchup was scheduled to take place but was canceled due to the COVID-19 pandemic.

=== Notre Dame ===
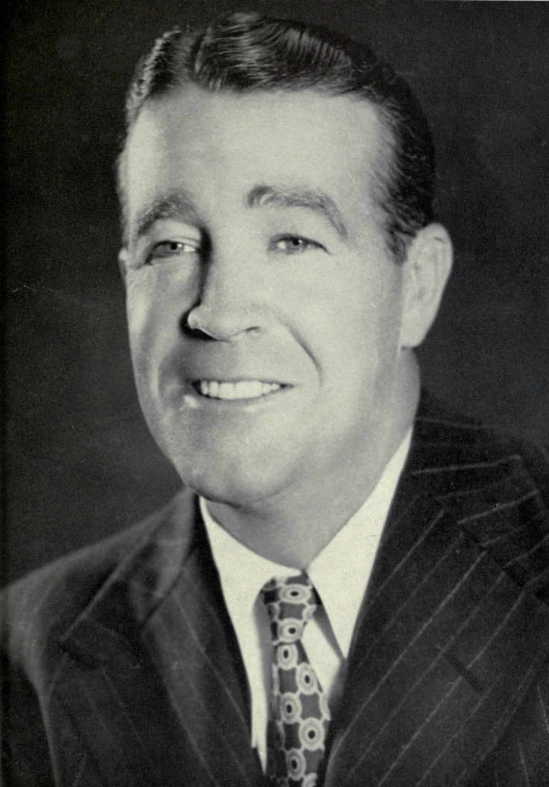
Legendary HC Frank Leahy coached at both BC and Notre Dame

In recent years, Notre Dame has become one of BC's football rivals. Today, ND is the only other Catholic university playing NCAA Division I FBS football. The matchup was dubbed the "Holy War" in 1975, and has acquired a number of other nicknames over the years. The two teams battle for the Frank Leahy Memorial Bowl and the Ireland Trophy.

The Eagles and the Fighting Irish have met once in the postseason; Notre Dame defeated Boston College in the 1983 Liberty Bowl by a score of 19–18. Boston College will host in 2025, 2030, and 2033, and Notre Dame will host in 2028 and 2035.

Notre Dame leads the all-time series 18–9 as of the 2022 season.

=== UMass ===
BC and UMass are in-state rivals. The first game played between the two schools took place in 1899 and was played at a neutral location. Boston College won 18–0. At the time, UMass was known as Massachusetts Agricultural College. The relative proximity between the schools encouraged them to schedule additional matches in the subsequent years.

BC and UMass met again in Amherst, Massachusetts in 1901, 1902, and 1912, with UMass winning all three contests before the series was halted. The two universities did not meet again on the football field until 1966, when they began a seventeen-year series in which the teams would play each other in the last week of UMass' football season. UMass was in a lower division than BC during the entirety of the rivalry. As such, Boston College dominated the stretch, winning 15 of the 17 games, routinely blowing out the overmatched Minutemen.

After 22 years, the rivalry was renewed as UMass traveled to Chestnut Hill, Massachusetts to play Boston College once again. UMass was yet again outmatched, losing 29–7. The universities agreed to play two more times over the next seven years, and Boston College won both games easily.

In April 2011, UMass announced plans to join the Mid-American Conference and move up to the NCAA Football Bowl Subdivision, the highest level of college football in the country. Boston College had been a member of this division for decades, and there was much speculation that the two schools may cultivate a renewal of the rivalry. This was confirmed when it was reported in September, 2011, that they had agreed to play a three-game biannual series beginning in 2014. Two of the games will be played at BC's Alumni Stadium and the other will be held at Gillette Stadium.

Boston College is on an 11-game winning streak vs UMass, dating back to 1979, after beating the Minutemen 45–28 in the 2021 season, and they lead the all-time series 22–5.

=== Villanova ===
Boston College and Villanova have a dormant rivalry. The two Catholic universities met 46 times, and played a home-and-home series from 1945 to 1980 (save 1954), until Villanova disbanded their 1-A program. They last met in 2013 with Villanova as an FCS opponent for the Eagles, with Boston College taking the 24–14 victory at Chestnut Hill.

=== Virginia Tech ===
BC and Virginia Tech first played in 1993 and have played every year since, except for 2004. Now both in the ACC, the two schools play each other every year despite not being in the same division.

The schools played each other twice in the same season in both 2007 and 2008; in both years, the Eagles won the regular season meeting while the Hokies won the rematch in the ACC Championship Game.

Virginia Tech is famed for its seeming invincibility in Thursday night games at Lane Stadium. Since 1994, the Hokies are 11–3 at home on Thursday nights. The Eagles delivered 2 of those 3 losses and until 2009 were the only team to beat Virginia Tech at Lane Stadium on a Thursday night. The 2007 Thursday night meeting between the Eagles and Hokies was undoubtedly the most exciting game of the rivalry. Matt Ryan led the No. 2 Eagles to an improbable comeback, scoring 2 TDs in the final 2:11 of the game to give BC a 14–10 victory over the No. 8 Virginia Tech.

Virginia Tech leads the all-time series 19–11 as of the 2021 season.

== Awards and honors ==
=== Individual award winners ===
- Heisman Trophy

Doug Flutie – 1984

- Maxwell Award

Doug Flutie – 1984

- Walter Camp Award

Doug Flutie – 1984

- Davey O'Brien Award

Doug Flutie – 1984

- Outland Trophy

Mike Ruth – 1985

- Johnny Unitas Golden Arm Award

Matt Ryan – 2007

- Manning Award

Matt Ryan – 2007

- Disney's Wide World of Sports Spirit Award

Mark Herzlich – 2009

- Butkus Award

Luke Kuechly – 2011

- Lombardi Award

Luke Kuechly – 2011

- Lott Trophy

Luke Kuechly – 2011

- Bronko Nagurski Trophy

Luke Kuechly – 2011

- Doak Walker Award

Andre Williams – 2013

=== Consensus All-Americans ===
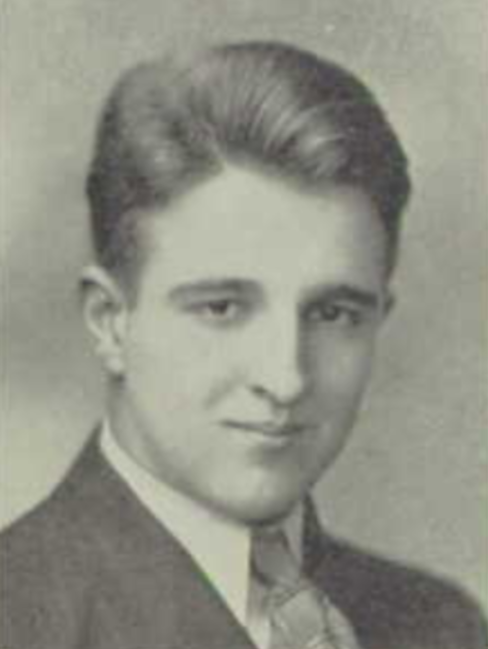
Gene Goodreault (1938–40)

Boston College has had 13 consensus All-Americans.

- Luke Urban – 1920
- Gene Goodreault – 1940
- Mike Holovak – 1942
- Doug Flutie – 1984
- Tony Thurman – 1984
- Mike Ruth – 1985
- Pete Mitchell – 1994
- Mike Cloud – 1998
- William Green – 2001
- Jamie Silva – 2007
- Luke Kuechly – 2010, 2011
- Andre Williams – 2013
- Donovan Ezeiruaku – 2024

Doug Flutie (1984), Luke Kuechly (2010), and Andre Williams (2013) were all unanimous selections.

=== Individual honors ===
==== Retired numbers ====
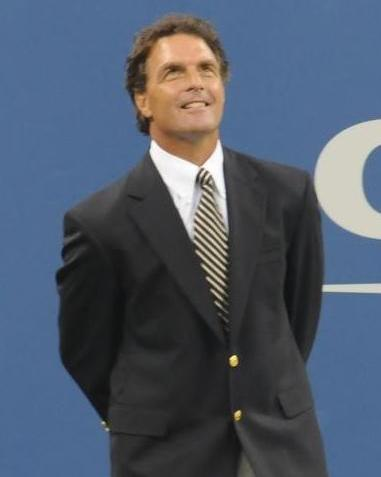
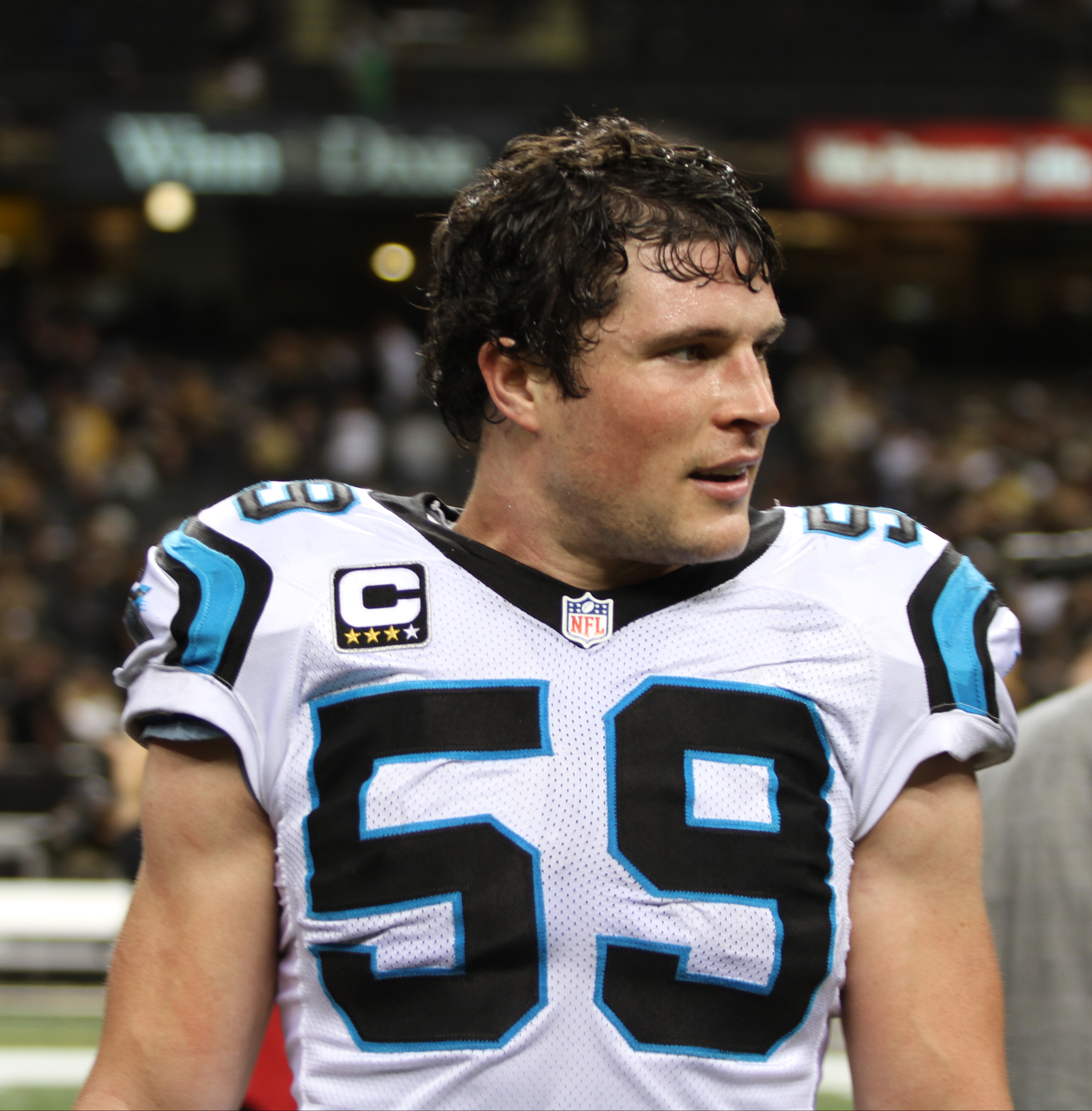
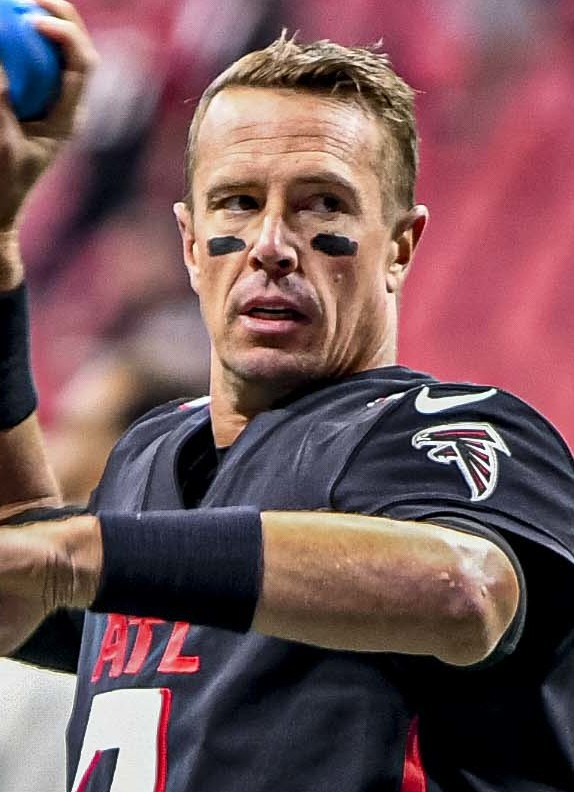
Doug Flutie, one of the two players who have his number retired (left); Luke Kuechly (center) and Matt Ryan have their jerseys honored

Two players have been honored with retired numbers by the BC football program.

Boston College Eagles retired numbers
No.	Player	Pos.	Tenure	Ref.
22	Doug Flutie	QB	1981–1984	
68	Mike Ruth	DL	1982–1985	

==== Honored jerseys ====
The Eagles have honored 11 jerseys in addition to the above noted retired numbers. These players' uniform numbers are not considered to be retired, and jersey placards at Alumni Stadium feature each player's name above the BC logo, without any number.

Boston College Eagles honored jerseys
Player	Pos.	Tenure
Art Donovan	T	1946–1949
Bill Flynn	E	1936–1938
Gene Goodreault	E	1938–1940
Mike Holovak	FB	1940–1942
Luke Kuechly	LB	2009–2011
Pete Mitchell	TE	1991–1994
Lou Montgomery	HB	1937–1940
Charlie O'Rourke	QB	1938–1940
Matt Ryan	QB	2004–2007
Tony Thurman	CB	1981–1985
Luke Urban	E	1916–1917, 1919–1920

=== College Football Hall of Fame ===
Eight former BC players and three former coaches have been inducted into the College Football Hall of Fame. Five players from the 1940 "Team of Destiny", as well as the coach, are among the inductees. (Year Inducted)

- Gil Dobie – Coach (1951)
- Frank Cavanaugh – Coach (1954)
- Frank Leahy – Coach (1970)
- Charlie O'Rourke – QB (1972)
- Chet Gladchuk – C (1975)
- Gene Goodreault – E (1982)
- George Kerr – G (1984)
- Mike Holovak – FB (1985)
- Doug Flutie – QB (2007)
- Mike Ruth – DT (2017)
- Luke Kuechly - LB (2023)

=== Conference honors ===
- Big East Offensive Player of the Year

Glenn Foley – 1993

- Big East Defensive Player of the Year

Mathias Kiwanuka – 2004

- Big East Rookie of the Year

Brian Toal – 2004

- ACC Player of the Year

Matt Ryan – 2007

- ACC Offensive Player of the Year

Matt Ryan – 2007

- ACC Defensive Player of the Year

Mark Herzlich – 2008
Luke Kuechly – 2011

- ACC Rookie of the Year

A. J. Dillon – 2017

- ACC Offensive Rookie of the Year

A. J. Dillon – 2017

- ACC Defensive Rookie of the Year

Luke Kuechly – 2009

- ACC Jacobs Blocking Trophy

Josh Beekman – 2006

- Brian Piccolo Award

Mark Herzlich – 2010

== Eagles in the NFL ==
Since 2000, the Eagles have had 36 players selected in the NFL draft. Of those picks, 9 were first round selections. BC had consecutive top 10 picks in 2008 and 2009; Matt Ryan was selected 3rd overall by the Atlanta Falcons in 2008 and B. J. Raji was selected 9th overall by the Green Bay Packers in 2009. Luke Kuechly has been the most recent Eagle stand-out in the NFL, selected by the Carolina Panthers with the 9th overall pick in the 2012 NFL draft. Zay Flowers was the most recent player to be selected in the 1st round, after being chosen by the Baltimore Ravens with the 22nd overall pick in the 2023 NFL draft.

=== "O-Line U" ===
The Eagles have a reputation of producing high-quality NFL offensive linemen, earning the school the nickname "O-Line U". Notable alums of O-Line U include:

- Tom Nalen (1989–1993): 3× All-Pro teams, 5× Pro Bowl selection, 2× Super Bowl champion
- Ron Stone (1989–1992): 2× All-Pro teams, 3× Pro Bowl selection, 2× Super Bowl champion
- Damien Woody (1995–1998): 1× Pro Bowl selection, 2× Super Bowl champion
- Dan Koppen (1999–2002): 1× All-Pro team, 1× Pro Bowl selection, 2× Super Bowl champion
- Chris Snee (2000–2003): 3× All-Pro teams, 4× Pro Bowl selection, 2× Super Bowl champion
- Chris Lindstrom (2015–2018): 2x All-Pro teams, 2x Pro Bowl selection

== Notable players ==
- Josh Beekman
- Will Blackmon
- John Bosa
- Paul Boudreau
- Stephen Boyd
- Ron Brace
- Brian Brennan
- Ricky Brown
- Tim Bulman
- Anthony Castonzo
- Gosder Cherilus
- Mark Chmura
- Mike Cloud
- Marc Colombo
- Bill Cronin (fullback)
- Bill Cronin (tight end)
- Jack Cronin
- Peter Cronin (linebacker)
- Anthony DiCosmo
- A. J. Dillon
- Art Donovan
- Jo-Lonn Dunbar
- Kasim Edebali
- Donovan Ezeiruaku
- Zay Flowers
- Darren Flutie
- Doug Flutie
- Ian Silberman
- Glenn Foley
- Nate Freese
- Robert Francois
- Antonio Garay
- William Green
- Gary Gulman
- Matt Hasselbeck
- Tim Hasselbeck
- Mark Herzlich
- Chris Hovan
- Harold Landry
- Chris Lindstrom
- Al Louis-Jean
- Pete Kendall
- Luke Kuechly
- Mathias Kiwanuka
- Dan Koppen
- Mike Mamula
- Mike Mayock
- Matt Milano
- Pete Mitchell
- Tom Nalen
- Joe Nash
- Okechukwu Okoroha
- Gerard Phelan
- Kevin Pierre-Louis
- Quinton Porter
- B. J. Raji
- Alex Riley
- Bill Romanowski
- Mike Ruth
- Matt Ryan
- Sean Ryan
- Tim Sherwin
- Jamie Silva
- Justin Simmons
- Fred Smerlas
- Chris Snee
- Brian St. Pierre
- Karl Swanke
- Matt Tennant
- Jeremy Trueblood
- Tom Waddle
- Lenny Walls
- Andre Williams
- Damien Woody
- Paul Zukauskas

== Future non-conference opponents ==
Announced schedules as of July 31, 2025.

2026	2027	2028	2029	2030	2031	2032	2033	2034	2035	2036
at Cincinnati	UTEP	at BYU	BYU	Maine	Alabama		Notre Dame	at Alabama	at Ohio State	Ohio State
Rutgers	at Rutgers	New Hampshire	at UConn	UConn	at UConn				at Notre Dame	
Maine	Cincinnati	Army		Notre Dame						
at Notre Dame	Rhode Island	at Notre Dame								

== See also ==
- Lambert-Meadowlands Trophy
