= List of Boston College Eagles in the NFL draft =

This is a list of Boston College Eagles football players in the NFL draft.

== Key ==
B	Back	K	Kicker	NT	Nose tackle
C	Center	LB	Linebacker	FB	Fullback
DB	Defensive back	P	Punter	HB	Halfback
DE	Defensive end	QB	Quarterback	WR	Wide receiver
DT	Defensive tackle	RB	Running back	G	Guard
E	End	T	Offensive tackle	TE	Tight end

== Selections ==
Year	Round	Pick	Player	Team	Position
1940	7	53	Pete Cignetti	Pittsburgh Steelers	B
1940	18	163	Ernie Schwartzer	Philadelphia Eagles	G
1941	2	12	Chet Gladchuck	Pittsburgh Steelers	C
1941	2	15	Gene Goodreault	Detroit Lions	E
1941	5	39	Charlie O'Rourke	Chicago Bears	B
1941	8	65	Joe Manzo	Detroit Lions	T
1941	9	78	Henry Toczylowski	Brooklyn Dodgers	B
1941	15	131	Alex Lukachick	Philadelphia Eagles	E
1941	17	151	John Yauckoes	Philadelphia Eagles	E
1941	19	173	George Kerr	Pittsburgh Steelers	E
1942	3	18	Ted Williams	Philadelphia Eagles	B
1942	8	70	Frank Maznicki	Chicago Bears	B
1942	21	194	Henry Woronicz	Green Bay Packers	E
1942	21	195	Adolph Kissell	Chicago Bears	E
1943	1	5	Mike Holovak	Cleveland Rams	B
1943	3	18	Don Currivan	Chicago Cardinals	E
1943	3	20	Fred Naumetz	Cleveland Rams	C
1943	5	37	Harry Connolly	Pittsburgh Steelers	B
1943	9	72	Rocco Canale	Philadelphia Eagles	E
1943	12	107	Joe Repko	Pittsburgh Steelers	T
1943	29	219	Wally Boudreau	Chicago Bears	B
1944	3	26	Gil Bouley	Cleveland Rams	T
1944	5	39	Ed Doherty	Washington Redskins	B
1944	10	98	Angelo Sisti	Boston Yanks	T
1944	12	120	Al Fiorentino	Boston Yanks	E
1944	25	235	John Dubzinski	New York Giants	G
1944	29	300	Pasquale Darone	Philadelphia Eagles	G
1945	20	201	Mario Giannelli	Boston Yanks	T
1945	26	264	Ed Burns	Pittsburgh Steelers	B
1945	27	278	Bob Mangene	Boston Yanks	B
1946	8	62	Chet Lipka	Boston Yanks	E
1946	15	132	John Furey	Boston Yanks	T
1946	20	186	Bill DeRosa	Green Bay Packers	B
1947	14	123	John Kissell	Los Angeles Rams	T
1947	2	204	Art Donovan	New York Giants	T
1948	27	254	Ed Clasby	Chicago Bears	B
1949	9	85	Tom Brennan	Pittsburgh Steelers	T
1949	18	173	Albie Gould	Boston Yanks	E
1950	2	22	Ernie Stautner	Pittsburgh Steelers	DT
1950	4	50	Dom Papaleo	Chicago Bears	G
1950	15	184	Art Spinney	Baltimore Colts	E
1950	19	247	Butch Songin	Cleveland Browns	QB
1951	4	50	Art Donovan	Cleveland Browns	T
1951	8	88	Art Spinney	Cleveland Browns	E
1951	18	209	Ed Patela	Green Bay Packers	B
1951	22	263	Ed King	New York Yanks	C
1953	11	127	Joe Johnson	Green Bay Packers	B
1953	29	343	Henry O'Brien	Green Bay Packers	B
1955	2	21	Frank Morze	San Francisco 49ers	C
1955	9	100	John Miller	Washington Redskins	T
1956	10	119	Dick Lucas	Chicago Bears	E
1956	18	206	Emiddio Petrarca	Detroit Lions	B
1958	7	78	Leon Bennett	Washington Redskins	T
1958	25	291	Larry Plenty	Green Bay Packers	B
1959	1	4	Don Allard	Washington Redskins	QB
1959	19	219	Alan Miller	Philadelphia Eagles	B
1959	30	353	Jim Colclough	Washington Redskins	B
1960	10	117	Jim O'Brien	Detroit Lions	T
1960	12	137	Harry Ball	Green Bay Packers	T
1962	3	37	Dan Sullivan	Baltimore Colts	T
1962	4	55	Bill Byrne	Philadelphia Eagles	G
1963	9	123	Gene Carrington	Pittsburgh Steelers	T
1963	11	149	Art Graham	Cleveland Browns	E
1963	13	171	Dave O'Brien	Minnesota Vikings	T
1963	14	188	Lou Cioci	Dallas Cowboys	DE
1964	2	16	Jack Concannon	Philadelphia Eagles	RB
1965	4	51	Jim Whalen	Minnesota Vikings	E
1965	20	272	Bobby Shann	Philadelphia Eagles	E
1966	20	94	Bill Risio	Philadelphia Eagles	T
1967	1	9	Bob Hyland	Green Bay Packers	G
1967	13	316	Bill Stetz	New Orleans Saints	LB
1968	4	92	Brendan McCarthy	Green Bay Packers	RB
1968	9	232	Mike Evans	Philadelphia Eagles	C
1968	11	286	Len Persin	Philadelphia Eagles	DE
1968	13	346	Jim Kavanaugh	Kansas City Chiefs	WR
1968	16	414	Lary Kuharich	Minnesota Vikings	DB
1969	7	167	John Eagan	Miami Dolphins	C
1969	10	249	Joe Pryor	Houston Oilers	DE
1969	11	266	Barry Gallup	Boston Patriots	WR
1970	4	101	John Fitzgerald	Dallas Cowboys	T
1970	8	200	Bob Bouley	Baltimore Colts	T
1971	4	93	Fred Willis	Cincinnati Bengals	RB
1971	6	150	Frank Harris	Detroit Lions	QB
1971	10	242	Jim O'Shea	Pittsburgh Steelers	TE
1971	16	415	John Brennan	Dallas Cowboys	T
1972	1	26	Bill Thomas	Dallas Cowboys	RB
1972	14	350	Ed Rideout	New England Patriots	WR
1972	16	395	Tom Bougus	Denver Broncos	RB
1972	17	437	Kevin Clemente	Washington Redskins	LB
1973	4	103	Jeff Yeates	Buffalo Bills	DT
1974	2	30	Steve Corbett	New England Patriots	G
1974	2	31	Gordon Browne	New York Jets	T
1974	3	70	Gary Marangi	Buffalo Bills	QB
1974	7	182	Joe Sullivan	Miami Dolphins	G
1974	8	200	Ned Guillet	Green Bay Packers	DB
1974	10	250	Tom Condon	Kansas City Chiefs	G
1974	13	321	Phil Bennett	New England Patriots	RB
1974	17	424	Gary Hudson	New England Patriots	DB
1975	2	39	Al Krevis	Cincinnati Bengals	T
1975	7	159	Mike Esposito	Atlanta Falcons	RB
1975	11	265	Tom Marinelli	Cleveland Browns	G
1975	12	310	Jack Magee	Oakland Raiders	C
1976	2	31	Don Macek	San Diego Chargers	G
1976	2	47	Mike Kruczek	Pittsburgh Steelers	QB
1976	5	146	Fred Steinfort	Oakland Raiders	K
1976	5	149	Keith Barnette	Minnesota Vikings	RB
1977	1	18	Steve Schindler	Denver Broncos	G
1977	2	30	Tom Lynch	Seattle Seahawks	T
1977	2	51	Peter Cronan	Seattle Seahawks	LB
1977	3	64	Robert Watts	New Orleans Saints	LB
1977	9	224	Byron Hemingway	Tampa Bay Buccaneers	LB
1977	9	230	John Maxwell	Atlanta Falcons	T
1977	9	247	Clen Capriola	Baltimore Colts	RB
1977	10	274	Don Petersen	Los Angeles Rams	TE
1979	2	32	Fred Smerlas	Buffalo Bills	DT
1979	9	238	Jim Rourke	Oakland Raiders	T
1980	3	71	John Schmeding	Buffalo Bills	G
1980	6	143	Karl Swanke	Green Bay Packers	G
1980	8	205	Jeff Dziama	New York Jets	LB
1981	4	94	Tim Sherwin	Baltimore Colts	TE
1981	10	265	Mike Mayock	Pittsburgh Steelers	DB
1981	11	293	Bill Stephanos	Minnesota Vikings	T
1982	4	102	Gerry Raymond	New York Giants	G
1982	6	147	Greg Storr	Minnesota Vikings	LB
1983	6	144	Gary Kowalski	Los Angeles Rams	T
1983	9	227	Jack Belcher	Los Angeles Rams	C
1984	4	104	Brian Brennan	Cleveland Browns	WR
1984	4	110	Steve DeOssie	Dallas Cowboys	LB
1984	7	188	George Radachowsky	Los Angeles Rams	DB
1985	4	108	Gerard Phelan	New England Patriots	WR
1985	5	115	Mark MacDonald	Minnesota Vikings	G
1985	11	285	Doug Flutie	Los Angeles Rams	QB
1985	11	303	Steve Strachan	Los Angeles Raiders	RB
1985	12	317	Todd Russell	Philadelphia Eagles	DB
1986	2	42	Mike Ruth	New England Patriots	DT
1986	4	109	Scott Gieselman	New England Patriots	TE
1987	1	16	John Bosa	Miami Dolphins	DE
1987	4	95	Kelvin Martin	Dallas Cowboys	WR
1987	4	96	Steve Trapilo	New Orleans Saints	G
1987	4	99	Troy Stradford	Miami Dolphins	RB
1988	3	80	Bill Romanowski	San Francisco 49ers	LB
1988	4	94	Dave Widell	Dallas Cowboys	T
1988	11	287	John Galvin	New York Jets	LB
1988	12	321	Dave Nugent	New England Patriots	DT
1989	1	17	Joe Wolf	Phoenix Cardinals	G
1989	2	41	Doug Widell	Denver Broncos	G
1989	7	178	Eric Lindstrom	New England Patriots	LB
1989	11	289	Jim Bell	San Francisco 49ers	RB
1990	4	109	Rico Labbe	Washington Redskins	DB
1991	11	286	Ivan Caesar	Minnesota Vikings	LB
1992	6	157	Mark Chmura	Green Bay Packers	TE
1993	4	96	Ron Stone	Dallas Cowboys	G
1994	7	208	Glenn Foley	New York Jets	QB
1994	7	218	Tom Nalen	Denver Broncos	C
1995	1	7	Mike Mamula	Philadelphia Eagles	DE
1995	4	122	Pete Mitchell	Miami Dolphins	TE
1995	5	141	Stephen Boyd	Detroit Lions	LB
1995	7	249	Michael Reed	Carolina Panthers	DB
1996	1	21	Pete Kendall	Seattle Seahawks	G
1996	4	119	Chris Sullivan	New England Patriots	DT
1997	3	78	Stalin Colinet	Minnesota Vikings	DE
1997	6	186	Daryl Porter	Pittsburgh Steelers	DB
1998	6	177	Todd Pollack	New York Giants	TE
1998	6	187	Matt Hasselbeck	Green Bay Packers	QB
1999	1	17	Damien Woody	New England Patriots	C
1999	2	54	Mike Cloud	Kansas City Chiefs	RB
1999	3	64	Doug Brzezinski	Philadelphia Eagles	G
2000	1	25	Chris Hovan	Minnesota Vikings	DT
2000	5	160	Frank Chamberlin	Tennessee Titans	LB
2000	6	188	Darnell Alford	Kansas City Chiefs	G
2001	7	203	Paul Zukauskas	Cleveland Browns	G
2002	1	16	William Green	Cleveland Browns	RB
2002	1	29	Marc Colombo	Chicago Bears	T
2003	5	163	Brian St. Pierre	Pittsburgh Steelers	QB
2003	5	164	Dan Koppen	New England Patriots	C
2003	6	195	Antonio Garay	Cleveland Browns	DE
2004	2	34	Chris Snee	New York Giants	G
2004	5	144	Sean Ryan	Dallas Cowboys	TE
2006	1	32	Mathias Kiwanuka	New York Giants	DE
2006	2	59	Jeremy Trueblood	Tampa Bay Buccaneers	T
2006	4	115	Will Blackmon	Green Bay Packers	DB
2007	3	67	James Marten	Dallas Cowboys	T
2007	4	130	Josh Beekman	Chicago Bears	G
2008	1	3	Matt Ryan	Atlanta Falcons	QB
2008	1	17	Gosder Cherilus	Detroit Lions	T
2008	6	192	DeJuan Tribble	San Diego Chargers	DB
2009	1	9	B. J. Raji	Green Bay Packers	DT
2009	2	40	Ron Brace	New England Patriots	DT
2010	5	158	Matt Tennant	New Orleans Saints	C
2011	1	22	Anthony Castonzo	Indianapolis Colts	T
2012	1	9	Luke Kuechly	Carolina Panthers	LB
2014	4	113	Andre Williams	New York Giants	RB
2014	4	132	Kevin Pierre-Louis	Seattle Seahawks	LB
2014	7	229	Nate Freese	Detroit Lions	K
2014	7	243	Kaleb Ramsey	San Francisco 49ers	DE
2015	6	190	Ian Silberman	San Francisco 49ers	T
2015	6	208	Andy Gallik	Tennessee Titans	C
2015	7	237	Brian Mihalik	Philadelphia Eagles	DE
2016	3	98	Justin Simmons	Denver Broncos	DB
2016	7	232	Steven Daniels	Washington Redskins	LB
2017	3	91	John Johnson	Los Angeles Rams	DB
2017	5	163	Matt Milano	Buffalo Bills	LB
2018	2	41	Harold Landry	Tennessee Titans	LB
2018	3	99	Isaac Yiadom	Denver Broncos	DB
2018	6	189	Kamrin Moore	New Orleans Saints	DB
2019	1	14	Chris Lindstrom	Atlanta Falcons	G
2019	3	65	Zach Allen	Arizona Cardinals	DE
2019	3	81	Will Harris	Detroit Lions	DB
2019	7	228	Tommy Sweeney	Buffalo Bills	TE
2020	2	62	A. J. Dillon	Green Bay Packers	RB
2021	3	81	Hunter Long	Miami Dolphins	TE
2021	6	220	Isaiah McDuffie	Green Bay Packers	LB
2022	1	17	Zion Johnson	Los Angeles Chargers	G
2023	1	22	Zay Flowers	Baltimore Ravens	WR
2024	3	90	Elijah Jones	Arizona Cardinals	DB
2024	6	210	Christian Mahogany	Detroit Lions	G
2025	2	44	Donovan Ezeiruaku	Dallas Cowboys	DE
2025	2	56	Ozzy Trapilo	Chicago Bears	T
2025	5	168	Drew Kendall	Philadelphia Eagles	C
2026	4	102	Jude Bowry	Buffalo Bills	T
2026	6	202	Logan Taylor	Los Angeles Chargers	G
2026	6	204	Lewis Bond	Houston Texans	WR
2026	6	247	Quintayvious Hutchins	New England Patriots	DE

== Notable undrafted players ==
Note: No drafts held before 1920

Year	Player	Position	Debut Team	Notes
1967	Tom Sarkisian	T	Philadelphia Eagles	—
1968	Joe DiVito	P/QB	Denver Broncos	—
1968	Terry Erwin	RB	Denver Broncos	—
1981	Mark Roopenian	DT	Buffalo Bills	—
1982	Joe Nash	DT	Seattle Seahawks	—
1985	Jim Browne	RB	Detroit Lions	—
1986	Shawn Regent	C	Green Bay Packers	—
1987	Shawn Halloran	QB	St. Louis Cardinals	—
1987	Rorery Perryman	DE	Green Bay Packers	—
1987	Tom Porell	DT	Atlanta Falcons	—
1987	Darren Twombly	C	New England Patriots	—
1989	Tom Waddle	WR	Chicago Bears	—
1991	Ed Toner	FB	Indianapolis Colts	—
1993	Tom McManus	LB	New Orleans Saints	—
1995	Gordon Laro	TE	Jacksonville Jaguars	—
1995	Brian Saxton	TE	New York Giants	—
1996	Mark Hartsell	QB	Washington Redskins	—
1996	Tim Morabito	DT	Cincinnati Bengals	—
1998	Scott Dragos	TE	New England Patriots	—
1998	Erik Storz	LB	Cincinnati Bengals	—
1999	Anthony DiCosmo	WR	Tampa Bay Buccaneers	—
2001	Tim Hasselbeck	QB	Buffalo Bills	—
2002	Lenny Walls	CB	Denver Broncos	—
2003	Vinny Ciurciu	LB	Carolina Panthers	—
2004	Augie Hoffmann	G	New Orleans Saints	—
2005	Tim Bulman	DT	Arizona Cardinals	—
2006	Par Ross	C/G	Seattle Seahawks	—
2008	Jamie Silva	S	Indianapolis Colts	—
2009	Chris Crane	QB	Indianapolis Colts	—
2009	Robert Francois	LB	Minnesota Vikings	—
2010	Rich Gunnell	WR	Kansas City Chiefs	—
2011	Mark Herzlich	LB	New York Giants	—
2012	Ryan Quigley	P	Chicago Bears	—
2014	Steele Divitto	LB	New York Jets	—
2014	Al Louis-Jean	CB	Chicago Bears	—
2014	Chase Rettig	QB	Green Bay Packers	—
2015	Josh Keyes	LB	Tampa Bay Buccaneers	—
2019	Aaron Monteiro	OT	Miami Dolphins	—
2019	Wyatt Ray	LB	Cleveland Browns	—
2019	Jeff Smith	WR	New York Jets	—
2019	Connor Strachan	LB	Jacksonville Jaguars	—
2019	Michael Walker	WR	Jacksonville Jaguars	—
2024	Kyle Hergel	OL	New Orleans Saints	—
2026	Ben Mann	LS	New York Giants	—
