= Charlie O'Rourke =

American football player and coach (1917–2000)

- O'Rourke as a Baltimore Colt, 1948

No. 48, 68, 66
- Position: Quarterback

Personal information
- Born: May 10, 1917; Montreal, Quebec, Canada
- Died: April 14, 2000 (aged 82); Brockton, Massachusetts, U.S.
- Listed height: 5 ft 11 in (1.80 m)
- Listed weight: 175 lb (79 kg)

Career information
- High school: Malden (Malden, Massachusetts)
- College: Boston College (1937-1940)
- NFL draft: 1941: 5th round, 39th overall pick

Career history

Playing
- Chicago Bears (1942); Los Angeles Dons (1946–1947); Baltimore Colts (1948-1949)

Coaching
- Baltimore Colts (1949-1950) Assistant coach; UMass (1952–1959) Head coach

Awards and highlights
- As player: National champion (1940); Sugar Bowl champion (1940); First-team All-American (1940); First-team All-Eastern (1940); AAFC completion percentage leader (1946); Boston College Eagles Jersey No. 13 retired

Career NFL/AAFC statistics
- Passing attempts: 506
- Passing completions: 256
- Completion percentage: 50.6%
- TD–INT: 39–51
- Passing yards: 4,039
- Passer rating: 63.6
- Stats at Pro Football Reference

Head coaching record
- Career: 21–39–4 (.359)
- College Football Hall of Fame

Charles Christopher "Chuckin' Charlie" O'Rourke Sr. (May 10, 1917 – April 14, 2000) was an American football player and coach. He played college football as a quarterback at Boston College and professionally with Chicago Bears of the National Football League (NFL) and the Los Angeles Dons and Baltimore Colts of the All-America Football Conference (AAFC).

As a collegian, O'Rourke quarterbacked the Boston College Eagles football team to one of its most famous wins. His 24-yard run late in the fourth quarter gave the 1940 Eagles a 19–13 victory over Tennessee in the 1941 Sugar Bowl, staking BC's claim to a national championship. O'Rourke served as the head football coach at University of Massachusetts Amherst (UMass) from 1952 to 1959, compiling a record of 21–39–4. In 1972, he came the first Boston College player to be inducted into the College Football Hall of Fame.

== Early life ==
Born in 1917, O'Rourke grew up in Malden, Massachusetts and played football at Malden High School. While at Malden, O'Rourke played the halfback position, earning three varsity letters and captaining the team during his senior year. He was named to the Massachusetts All-State football team twice — in both 1936 and 1937.

== Boston College ==
Although all of his records have been broken, O'Rourke was one of Boston College's first star quarterbacks. In three seasons, he completed 69 of 150 passes for 1,108 yards and 14 touchdowns.

The 1940 Boston College team is a team in the history of the school. After the previous year's team earned the school's first appearance in a bowl game (Boston College lost to Clemson in the 1940 Cotton Bowl Classic) O'Rourke's running backs included veterans Frank Maznicki, Lou Montgomery (Boston College's first African-American football player), and team captain Henry Toczylowski. They were joined by a newcomer named Mike Holovak. The team also had receivers including Henry Woronicz, Gene Goodreault, Ed Zabilski, and Don Currivan.

The 1940 team was undefeated outscoring its opponents 320–52 and held six teams scoreless. Boston College impressed the sports community by defeating Tulane 27–7 in the second week of the season and defeating Georgetown 19–18, snapping Georgetown's streak of twenty-two consecutive wins. On January 1, 1941, Boston College defeated Tennessee in the Sugar Bowl, 19–13. BC claims it won the national title in a three-way tie with Stanford and Minnesota, however the NCAA does not recognize Boston College as a national champion in that year.

O'Rourke was named an All-American in 1940 as a halfback, as well as being selected as Most Valuable Player in New England.

== Professional career ==
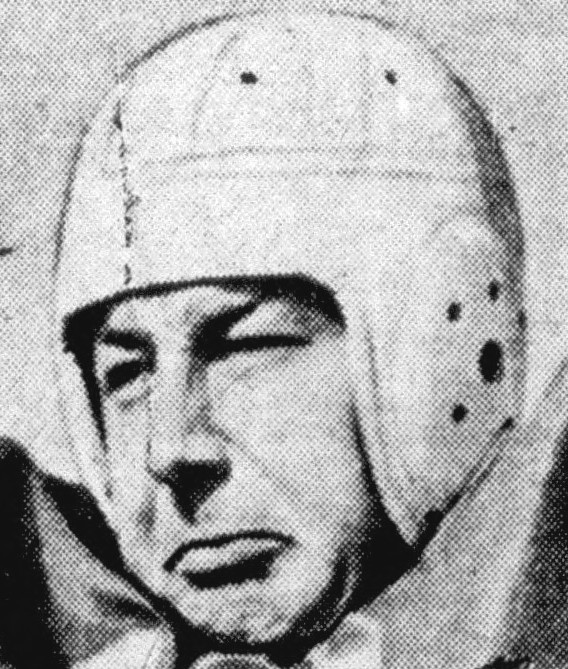
O'Rourke in 1945.

O'Rourke was drafted in the fifth round of the 1941 NFL Draft by the Chicago Bears. O'Rourke's professional career began in 1942 with the Chicago Bears. He saw limited playing time behind incumbent starter Sid Luckman, completing 37 of 88 passes for 951 yards, 11 touchdowns, and 16 interceptions. The 11 touchdowns set a new Bears rookie record which stood until 2024 when it was broken by Caleb Williams. O'Rourke also intercepted three passes on defense, returned two punts, and made 23 punts for 817 yards for the 11–0 Bears.

O'Rourke entered the United States Navy in 1943, playing football in California during the time of his service for the Fleet City Bluejackets.

After three years in the Navy, O'Rourke returned to professional football in 1946 signing a contract with the Los Angeles Dons of the upstart All-America Football Conference (AAFC). In two seasons in Los Angeles he completed 194 of 354 passes for 2,699 yards, 25 touchdowns, and 30 interceptions.

In 1948 he joined the AAFC's Baltimore Colts as a punter and back up quarterback behind Y. A. Tittle. In 1949, he played only five games before retiring and becoming an assistant coach for Baltimore until the team folded in 1950.

== Coaching career ==
Aside from his two years as an NFL coach, O'Rourke was head football coach at University of Massachusetts Amherst (UMass) from 1952 to 1959. In seasons he compiled a 21–39–4 record with only one winning season (1952).

== O'Rourke–McFadden Trophy ==
To honor the famed meeting between O'Rourke and Banks McFadden in the 1940 Cotton Bowl Classic, the O'Rourke–McFadden Trophy was introduced in 2008 and is awarded to the winner of the annual football game between Boston College and Clemson. The game is in-conference rivalry since Boston College joined the Atlantic Coast Conference (ACC) in 2005, and both teams play in the ACC's Atlantic Division.

== Head coaching record ==
Year	Team	Overall	Conference	Standing	Bowl/playoffs
UMass Redmen (Yankee Conference) (1952–1959)
1952	UMass	4–3–1	1–2	4th	
1953	UMass	1–7	0–3	6th	
1954	UMass	4–4	1–3	5th	
1955	UMass	4–4	1–3	5th	
1956	UMass	2–5–1	1–4	5th	
1957	UMass	1–5–1	1–2–1	4th	
1958	UMass	2–6	1–3	4th	
1959	UMass	3–5–1	2–2	2nd	
UMass:		21–39–4	8–22–1		
Total:		21–39–4			
