= Gene Goodreault =

American football player (1918–2010)

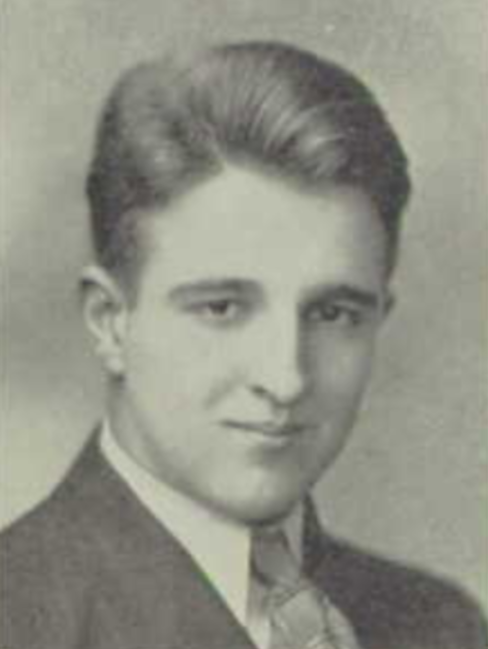

No. 50 – Boston College Eagles
- Position: End
- Class: Graduate

Personal information
- Born: July 31, 1918; Haverhill, Massachusetts, U.S.
- Died: July 13, 2010 (aged 91); Orinda, California, U.S.
- Listed height: 5 ft 10 in (1.78 m)
- Listed weight: 184 lb (83 kg)

Career information
- High school: Haverhill (Haverhill, MA)
- College: Boston College (1938–1940)

Awards and highlights
- National champion (1940); Sugar Bowl champion (1940); Consensus All-American (1940); Boston College Eagles Jersey No. 50 retired
- College Football Hall of Fame (Class of 1982)

Eugene Joseph Goodreault (July 31, 1918 – July 13, 2010) was an American football player. He played at the end position for Boston College from 1938 to 1940 and was selected as a consensus first-team All-American in 1940. He was inducted into the College Football Hall of Fame in 1982.

== Early life ==
Born in 1918, Goodreault attended Haverhill High School in Massachusetts where he was known as "Goo-Goo" Goodreault and was a member of the football, baseball and track teams.

== Boston College ==
Goodreault enrolled at Boston College in 1937. The school's publicity director, Billy Sullivan (later owner of the New England Patriots) befriended Goodreault and helped him to obtain therapy to overcome a speech impediment.

As a member of Boston College's football team, Goodreault was five feet, ten inches tall and weighed 180 pounds. His profile at the College Football Hall of Fame described him as follows: "Fast, powerful and alert, Gene Goodreault was outstanding as a pass-catcher and play-maker blocker on offense and as a play-blaster, destructive tackler on defense." In 1939, Goodreault's junior year, Frank Leahy was hired as the head of the Boston College Eagles football team. Goodreault helped lead the Eagles to a 9–2 record and the school's first bowl game, and appearance in the 1940 Cotton Bowl. At the end of the 1939 season, Goodreault received All-East honors and was also the first recipient of the George H. "Bulger" Lowe Trophy in 1940 as the outstanding football player in New England.

As a senior, Goodreault was a member of the 1940 Boston College team that compiled an undefeated record of 11–0, outscored opponents 320–52, recorded six shutouts, and defeated No. 4 Tennessee in the 1941 Sugar Bowl. After the season, Goodreault was selected as a consensus player on the 1940 College Football All-America Team. He received first-team honors from, among others, the United Press, the International News Service, the Central Press Association, and Collier's Weekly (selected by Grantland Rice).

== Later life ==
Goodreault was selected in the second round (15th overall pick) in the 1941 NFL draft, but he did not play in the NFL. He served in the United States Navy during World War II and operated a wool brokerage business in Massachusetts after the war. He lived in Haverhill until 2004.

Goodreault was inducted into the College Football Hall of Fame in 1982. He was also honored by Boston College as one of the inaugural inductees into its Varsity Club Hall of Fame in 1970. In 2001, Boston College retired his #50 jersey in a halftime ceremony at Alumni Stadium.

Goodreault moved to California in 2004. He died from cancer in 2010 at age 91 in Orinda, California.
