= O'Rourke–McFadden Trophy =

American college football rivalry

- Boston College Eagles Clemson Tigers
- Sport: Football
- First meeting: January 1, 1940; Clemson 6–3
- Latest meeting: October 11, 2025; Clemson 41–10
- Next meeting: 2027 in Clemson, SC

Statistics
- Total meetings: 33
- All-time series: Clemson leads, 22–9–2
- Largest victory: Clemson 59–7 (October 26, 2019)
- Longest win streak: Clemson 13 (2011–present)
- Current win streak: Clemson 13 (2011–present)

Locations of Boston College and Clemson

The O'Rourke–McFadden Trophy was created in 2008 by the Boston College Gridiron Club to commemorate the tradition at Clemson and Boston College while honoring the legacy of Charlie O'Rourke and Banks McFadden. O'Rourke and McFadden are members of the College Football Hall of Fame who played during the leather helmet era. Since the trophy's inception in 2008, the club has presented it to every winner of a Boston College–Clemson football game.

== Trophy history ==
The Boston College Gridiron Club commissioned the trophy to honor the relationship between Clemson and Boston College that began 86 years ago, in early 1940, and to recognize the support of Tiger fans in welcoming Boston College to the ACC, which BC joined in 2005.

The trophy features two leather helmet replicas of those used by O’Rourke of Boston College and McFadden of Clemson, when they competed against each other in the 1940 Cotton Bowl in Dallas, Texas. In addition to the trophy presentation, the Boston College Gridiron Club presents a replica leather helmet to the MVP of the winning school. The helmet will reflect the colors of the winning team.

=== Namesakes ===
Charlie O’Rourke led Boston College from the quarterback position to a 26–3–2 (.871) record in his three years (1938–40). One of those three losses was to McFadden and Clemson in the 1940 Cotton Bowl. O'Rourke went on to play quarterback and defensive back for the Chicago Bears, Los Angeles Dons, and Baltimore Colts. After two years as an NFL coach, he coached at Massachusetts (1952–59). O’Rourke later served as commissioner of the Pop Warner League, a national organization of junior football teams. His jersey was retired at Boston College and he was inducted into the College Football Hall of Fame in 1972.

Banks McFadden led the Tigers to a 9–1 record in 1939 as the starting quarterback. He was an All-American in football and basketball at Clemson. The 1939 football team finished 12th in the final AP poll (early December), for Clemson’s first top 20 season on record, and the win over Boston College in the Cotton Bowl was Clemson’s first bowl appearance. In the spring of 1939, he led Clemson to the Southern Conference Basketball championship. McFadden was Clemson’s first inductee into the College Football Hall of Fame in 1959. He was the fourth overall pick of the 1940 NFL draft by the Brooklyn Dodgers. After one year in the NFL and a stint in the Army Air Corps during World War II, he returned to Clemson and held coaching positions in football, basketball, and track. McFadden became the first coach in college basketball history to improve his conference wins in five consecutive seasons.

== Game results ==
Boston College victories	Clemson victories	Tie games

No.	Date	Location	Winner	Score
1	January 1, 1940	Dallas, TX	#15 Clemson	6–3
2	October 11, 1941	Boston, MA	Clemson	26–13
3	October 10, 1942	Boston, MA	Boston College	14–7
4	September 26, 1947	Boston, MA	Boston College	32–22
5	October 29, 1948	Boston, MA	#13 Clemson	26–19
6	November 5, 1949	Clemson, SC	Boston College	40–27
7	November 11, 1950	Boston, MA	#13 Clemson	35–14
8	November 10, 1951	Clemson, SC	Clemson	21–2
9	October 31, 1952	Boston, MA	Clemson	13–0
10	September 26, 1953	Boston, MA	Tie	14–14
11	November 22, 1958	Clemson, SC	#16 Clemson	34–12
12	November 19, 1960	Chestnut Hill, MA	Boston College	25–14
13	September 18, 1982	Clemson, SC	Tie	17–17
14	September 10, 1983	Chestnut Hill, MA	Boston College	31–16
15	September 24, 2005	Clemson, SC	Boston College	16–13
16	September 9, 2006	Chestnut Hill, MA	Boston College	34–33
17	November 17, 2007	Clemson, SC	#18 Boston College	20–17

No.	Date	Location	Winner	Score
18	November 1, 2008	Chestnut Hill, MA	Clemson	27–21
19	September 19, 2009	Clemson, SC	Clemson	25–7
20	October 30, 2010	Chestnut Hill, MA	Boston College	16–10
21	October 8, 2011	Clemson, SC	#8 Clemson	36–14
22	September 29, 2012	Chestnut Hill, MA	#17 Clemson	45–31
23	October 12, 2013	Clemson, SC	#3 Clemson	24–14
24	October 18, 2014	Chestnut Hill, MA	#24 Clemson	17–13
25	October 17, 2015	Clemson, SC	#5 Clemson	34–17
26	October 7, 2016	Chestnut Hill, MA	#3 Clemson	56–10
27	September 23, 2017	Clemson, SC	#2 Clemson	34–7
28	November 10, 2018	Chestnut Hill, MA	#2 Clemson	27–7
29	October 26, 2019	Clemson, SC	#4 Clemson	59–7
30	October 31, 2020	Clemson, SC	#1 Clemson	34–28
31	October 2, 2021	Clemson, SC	#25 Clemson	19–13
32	October 8, 2022	Chestnut Hill, MA	#5 Clemson	31–3
33	October 11, 2025	Chestnut Hill, MA	Clemson	41–10
Series: Clemson leads 22–9–2

== See also ==
- List of NCAA college football rivalry games
