= George Kerr (American football, born 1919) =

American football player and clergyman (1919–1983)

No. 47
- Position: Guard

Personal information
- Born: February 14, 1919; Brookline, Massachusetts, U.S.
- Died: January 23, 1983 (aged 63); South Weymouth, Massachusetts, U.S.
- Listed height: 6 ft 1 in (1.85 m)
- Listed weight: 185 lb (84 kg)

Career information
- High school: St. Mary's (Brookline, Massachusetts)
- College: Boston College
- NFL draft: 1941: 19th round, 173rd overall pick

Awards and highlights
- Third-team All-American (1940); First-team All-Eastern (1940)
- College Football Hall of Fame

George V. Kerr (February 14, 1919 – January 23, 1983) was an American football player and later a member of the catholic clergy of Boston.

== College football ==
The "Righteous Reject", as he was called at Boston College, Kerr was an All-East and All-American guard. Upon arriving on campus, George reported to BC coach, Gil Dobie, wearing three sweaters and two overcoats to boost his 155 pounds to 180 after he was told he was too small for college football. Kerr surprised everyone when he excelled as an offensive guard, receiving All-American mention. Frank Leahy later called Kerr the greatest scholar-athlete he ever coached.

Kerr was a member of the Eagles 1941 Sugar Bowl championship team where his performance against the University of Tennessee earned him a place on the All-Time Sugar Bowl team. Kerr then captained the unbeaten Eagles in 1940. He was later inducted into the Boston College Varsity Club Athletic Hall of Fame in 1970. He was drafted by the Pittsburgh Steelers in the 19th round of the 1941 NFL draft, however he never played with the team.

== Clergy ==
After his playing career ended, Kerr entered the seminary and was ordained in 1945. He was named a Domestic Prelate with the title Right Reverend Monsignor of Pope Paul VI in 1964. He served as Chaplain to the Great and General Court of Massachusetts and to the Boston Fire Department, in addition to his duties as pastor of an urban parish. He is best remembered for his commitment to inner-city education.
