= 1940 Cotton Bowl Classic =

- 4th Cotton Bowl Classic
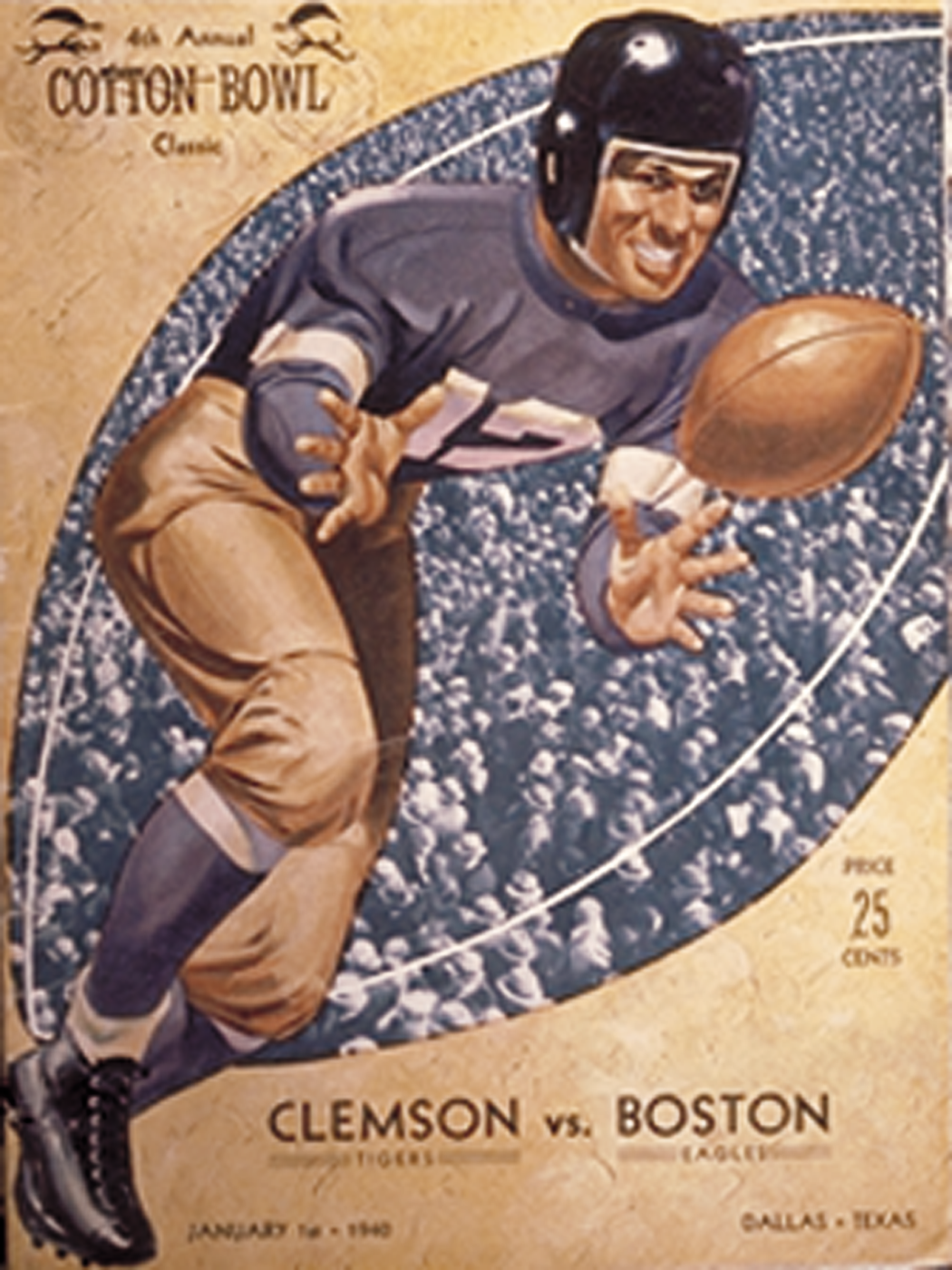
Clemson Tigers	Boston College Eagles
(8–1)	(9–1)
SoCon	Independent
6	3
Head coach: Jess Neely	Head coach: Frank Leahy
AP 12	AP 11
	1	2	3	4	Total
Clemson	0	6	0	0	6
Boston College	0	3	0	0	3
- Date: January 1, 1940
- Season: 1939
- Stadium: Cotton Bowl
- Location: Dallas, Texas
- MVP: Banks McFadden (Back, Clemson)
- Favorite: Clemson
- Referee: Paul N. Swaffield
- Attendance: 15,000
- Payout: US$15,000

The Cotton Bowl in Dallas, Texas, hosted the Cotton Bowl Classic.

The 1940 Cotton Bowl Classic was the fourth edition of the postseason college football bowl game, between the Clemson Tigers and the Boston College Eagles. It was played on Monday, January 1, 1940, at the Cotton Bowl in Dallas, Texas.

== Background ==
Texas A&M, the 1939 Southwest Conference (SWC) champion, declined to be in this game, instead playing in the Sugar Bowl. Tennessee of the Southeastern Conference (SEC) and Oklahoma of the Big Six also declined this game. Fearing for the longevity of the game, the president of the bowl's athletic association, J. Curtis Sanford, strove to keep the contest alive, extending invites to Clemson and Boston College (BC), who accepted; this was the first bowl game for both schools.

A key player on the BC team, halfback Lou Montgomery, the first Black athlete in the college's history, was forced to sit out the game due to racial segregation policies of the era. Sanford said that Montgomery would not be allowed to participate, asserting that keeping him out of the game was "deemed advisable, in view of the general attitude regarding negroes." The first interracial bowl game did not occur until after World War II, the 1948 Cotton Bowl Classic

With both teams from outside the region, attendance was low; the first three editions (and next six) included a team from the state of Texas.

== Game summary ==
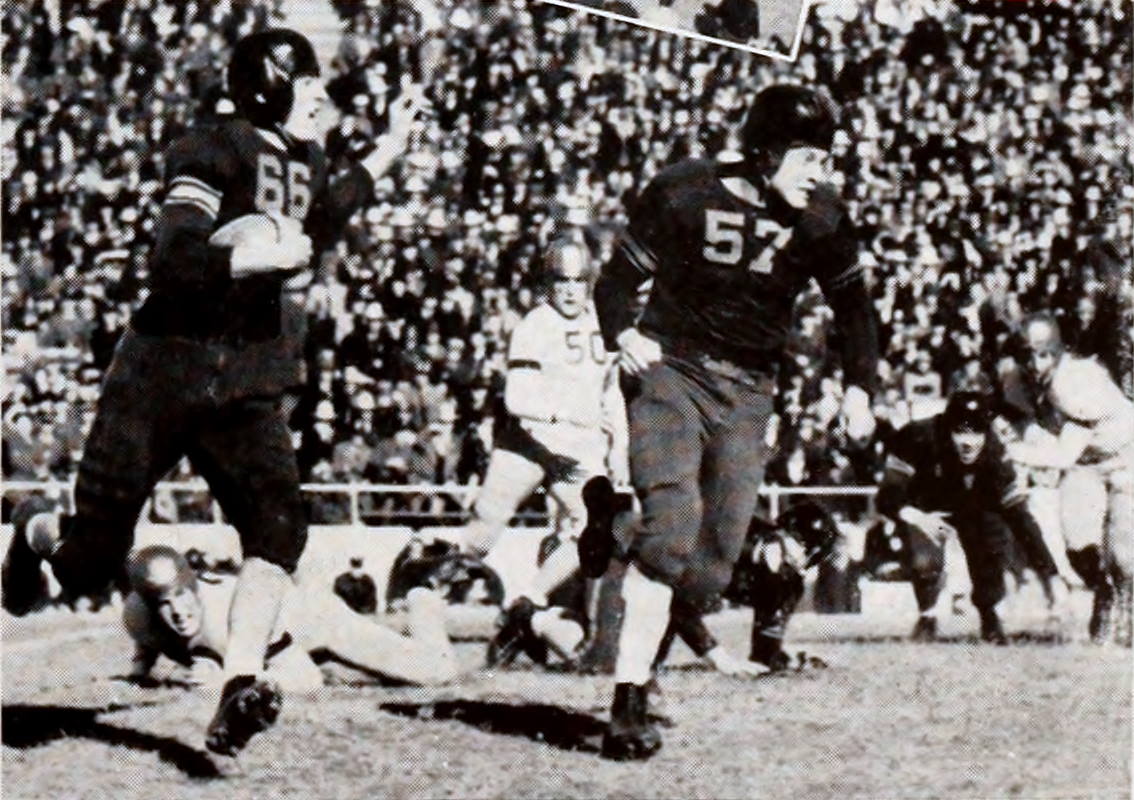
Banks McFadden carries the ball for Clemson

Boston College took the lead on a 30-yard field goal by Alex Lukachik early in the second quarter, after four failed plays following a punt return to the Clemson 13. After both teams exchanged punts throughout most of the quarter, Clemson got it back at their 43. They drove 57 yards and it culminated with a touchdown by sophomore Charlie Timmons, but the extra point was missed. The remainder of the game was scoreless as Clemson won their first bowl game, and All-American back Banks McFadden was named the game's most valuable player.

== Aftermath ==
Boston College's next bowl game, the 1941 Sugar Bowl, contested in New Orleans, also saw the team play without Lou Montgomery.

Forty-five years later, Boston College returned to the Cotton Bowl Classic, winning the 1985 edition led by Heisman Trophy winner Doug Flutie. Clemson returned in the 2018 edition with a College Football Playoff semifinal victory over Notre Dame.

The teams became conference foes in 2005, when BC joined the Atlantic Coast Conference. Since 2008, the O'Rourke–McFadden Trophy is awarded to the winner of the annual Boston College–Clemson game, honoring Charlie O'Rourke of BC and McFadden of Clemson, leaders of their teams in the 1940 Cotton Bowl Classic.

== See also ==
- Boston College–Clemson football rivalry
