= Banks McFadden =

American football and basketball player and coach (1917–2005)

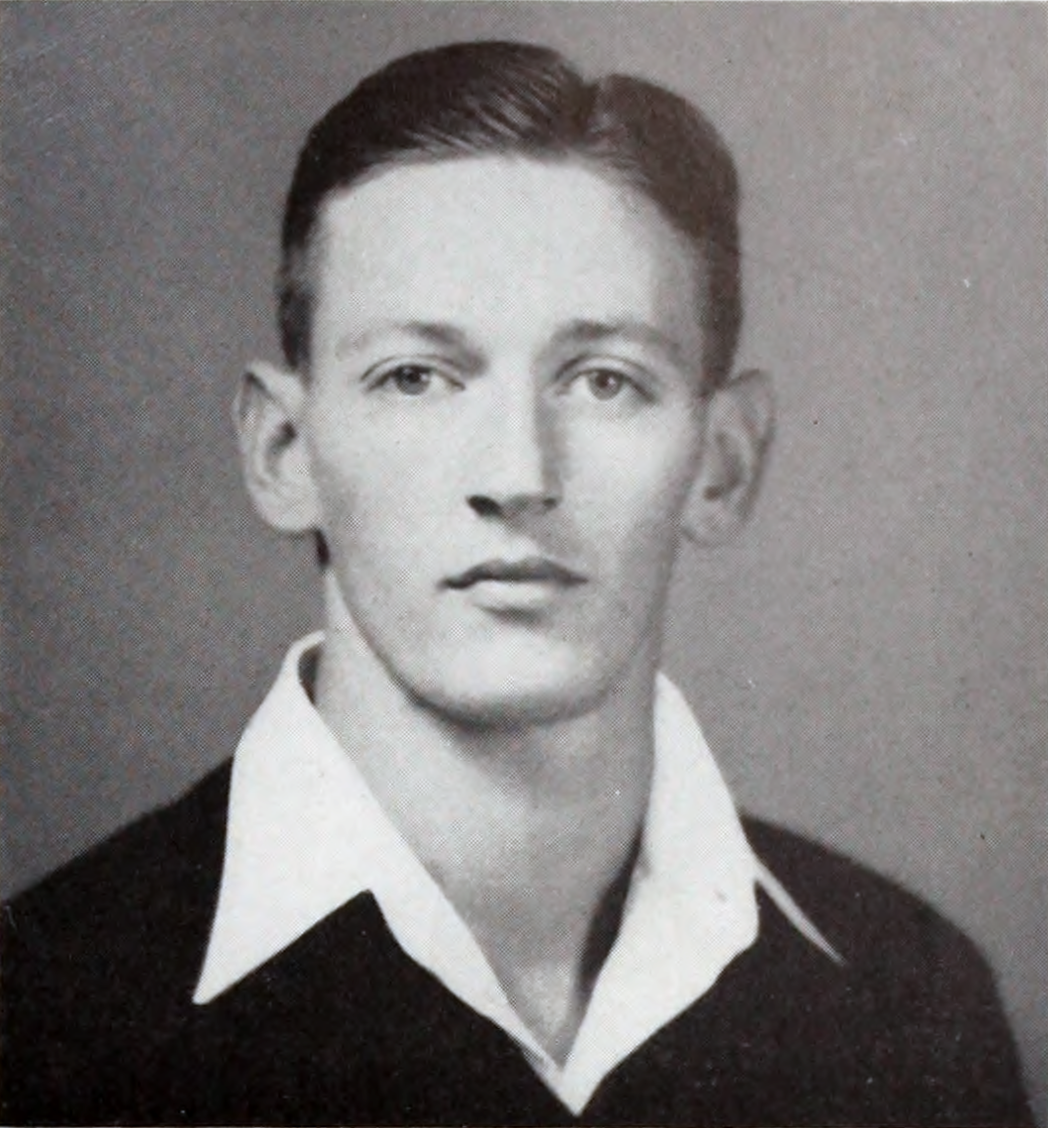
- McFadden c. 1940

No. 26
- Position: Halfback

Personal information
- Born: February 7, 1917; Fort Lawn, South Carolina, U.S.
- Died: June 4, 2005 (aged 88); Ormond Beach, Florida, U.S.
- Listed height: 6 ft 2 in (1.88 m)
- Listed weight: 178 lb (81 kg)

Career information
- High school: Great Falls (Great Falls, South Carolina)
- College: Clemson (1937–1939)
- NFL draft: 1940: 1st round, 4th overall pick

Career history
- Brooklyn Dodgers (1940)

Awards and highlights
- First-team All-American (1939); First-team All-SoCon (1939); Clemson Tigers No. 66 retired

Career NFL statistics
- Rushing yards: 411
- Rushing average: 4.8
- Rushing touchdowns: 1
- Receptions: 9
- Receiving yards: 97
- Receiving touchdowns: 2
- Stats at Pro Football Reference
- College Football Hall of Fame

James Banks McFadden (February 7, 1917 – June 4, 2005) was an American professional football and basketball player and coach. McFadden is best known for his association with Clemson University, where he spent 43 years as a player, coach, and administrator. He was elected to the College Football Hall of Fame in 1959 as a player.

== Early life ==
Born in Fort Lawn, South Carolina, McFadden attended Great Falls High School in Great Falls, South Carolina, where he led the Red Devils to two state championships in football and one in basketball.

== Playing career ==
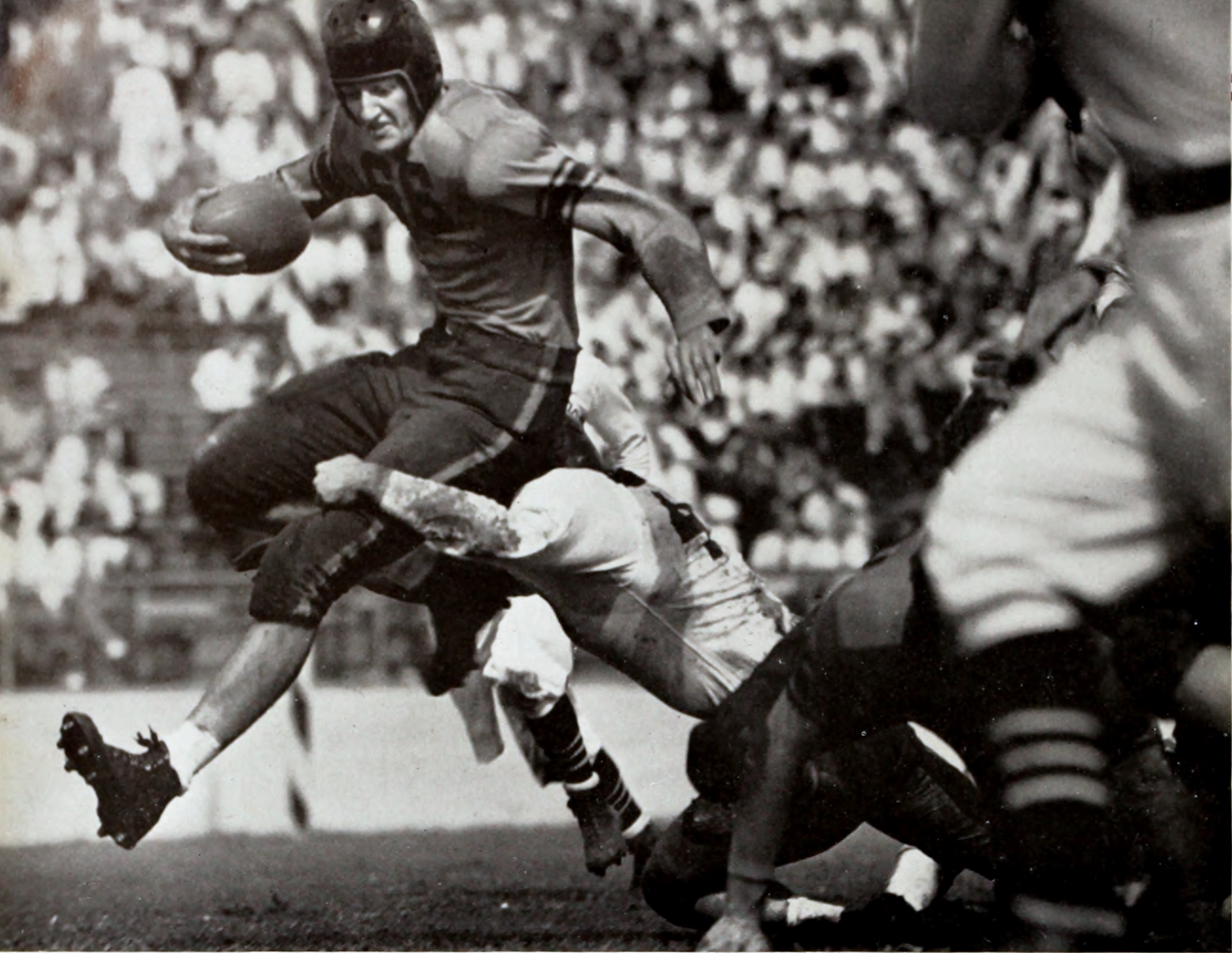
McFadden carrying the ball for Clemson against Tulane in 1939

McFadden is widely considered to be the greatest athlete in Clemson University history, lettering in three sports (football, basketball, and track). In 1939, McFadden was voted the Associated Press' "Athlete of the Year". McFadden was also a two-time All-American in basketball (1938 and 1939) and led the Tigers basketball team to a Southern Conference championship in 1939. McFadden also played halfback and punter on the football team and was named Clemson's first Associated Press All-American in football in 1939, which saw the Tigers play and win their 1st bowl game (1940 Cotton Bowl Classic).

Upon graduating, McFadden played football for the National Football League's Brooklyn Dodgers. He was the fourth overall pick in the 1940 NFL draft. In his first and only year as a professional, he played in 11 games. He had the longest rush in the NFL that year—75 yards. He was tied for second for most yards per attempt with a 4.8 yards per carry average. He was also fifth in the league for most rushing yards per game. Defensively he had two interceptions. Despite his success, McFadden preferred the small-town life and the family atmosphere of Clemson. He returned to the state of South Carolina to coach at his alma mater.

== Military and coaching career ==
McFadden fought in World War II and upon returning to the United States returned to coaching. McFadden served as Clemson's head basketball coach from 1946 to 1956 in addition to stints as head track and assistant football coach. He retired from coaching in 1969 and took over the university's intramural department, which he directed for 15 years.

== Legacy ==
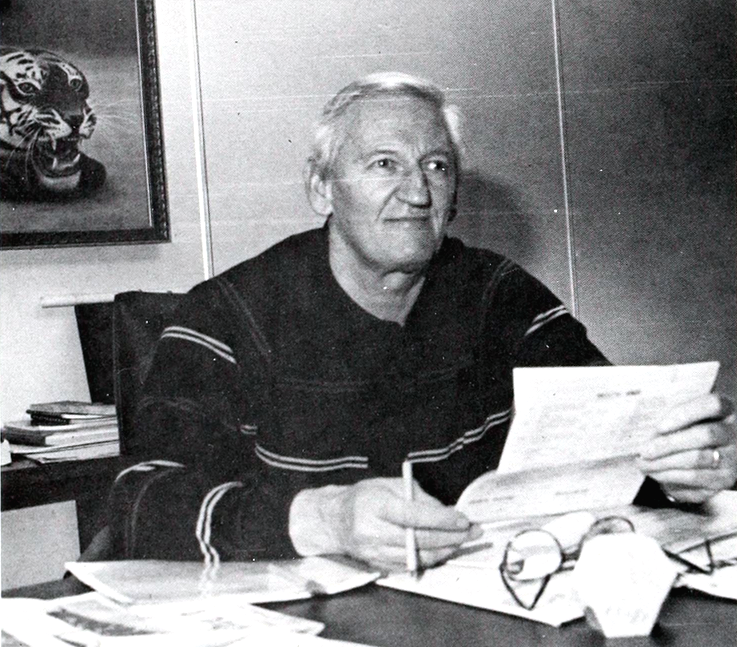
McFadden in 1977

On September 19, 1987, Clemson University retired his basketball No. 23 and football No. 66.

In October 2008, the O'Rourke–McFadden Trophy was introduced as a reward to the winner of the annual football game between Boston College and Clemson, in honor of the historic meeting between Charlie O'Rourke and Banks McFadden in the 1940 Cotton Bowl Classic, Clemson's first bowl appearance.
