= 1941 Sugar Bowl =

American college football game

- 7th Sugar Bowl
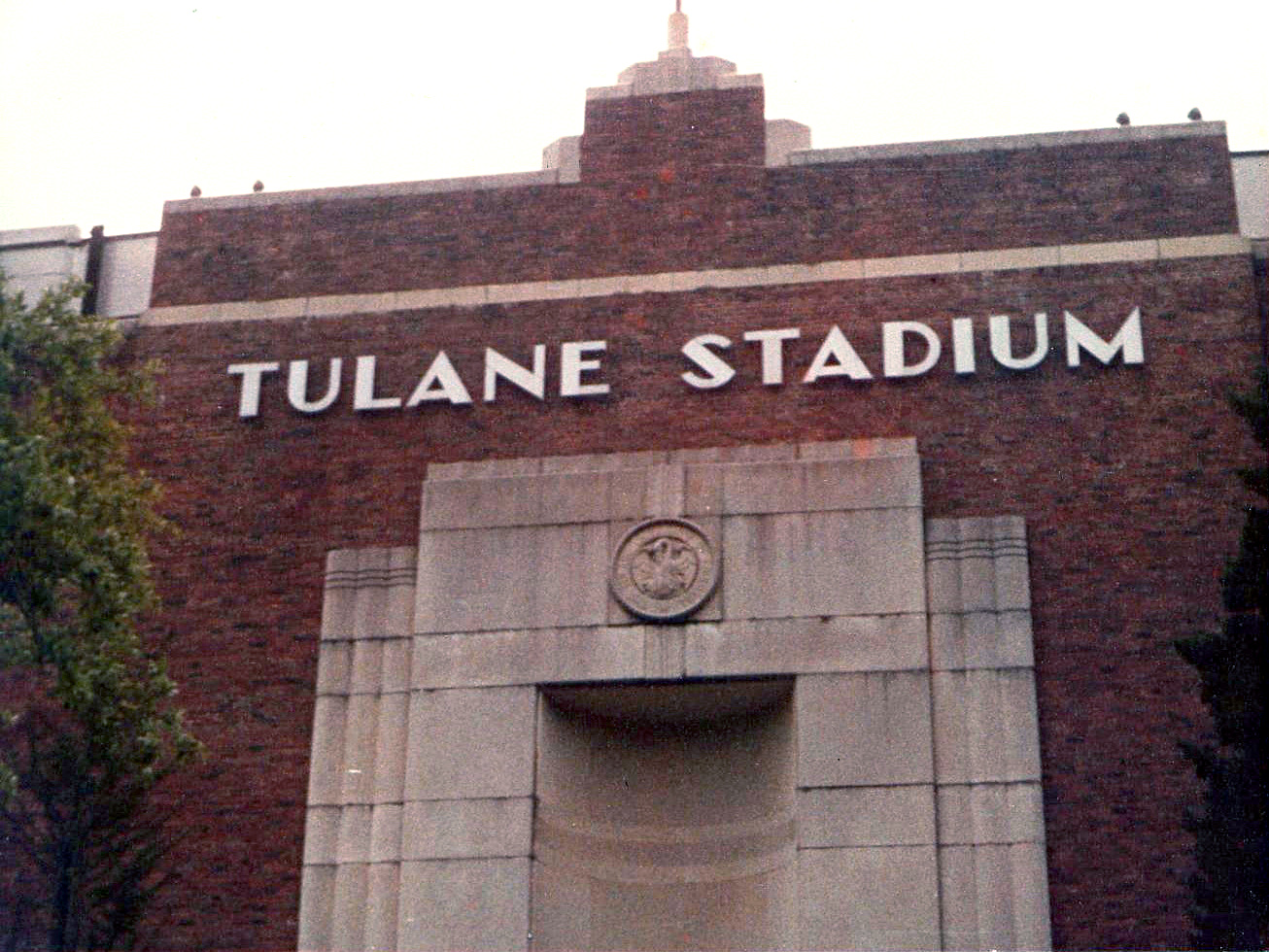
- Tulane Stadium in New Orleans, Louisiana, hosted the Sugar Bowl.
Boston College Eagles	Tennessee Volunteers
(10–0)	(10–0)
Independent	SEC
19	13
Head coach: Frank Leahy	Head coach: Robert Neyland
AP 5	AP 4
	1	2	3	4	Total
Boston College	0	0	13	6	19
Tennessee	7	0	6	0	13
- Date: January 1, 1941
- Season: 1940
- Stadium: Tulane Stadium
- Location: New Orleans, Louisiana
- Favorite: Tennessee
- Referee: James Cheves (SEC; split crew: SEC, EAIFO)
- Attendance: 73,181

The 1941 Sugar Bowl featured the fourth-ranked Tennessee Volunteers and the fifth-ranked Boston College Eagles, both with records of 10–0 and high-scoring offenses. The seventh edition of the Sugar Bowl, it was played on Wednesday, January 1, 1941, at Tulane Stadium in New Orleans, Louisiana.

Tennessee scored the only points of the first half with a four-yard touchdown run by Van Thompson in the first quarter. After a scoreless second quarter, Boston College scored on a 13-yard touchdown run from Harry Connolly to tie the score at 7–7. Tennessee answered with a two-yard touchdown run from Warren Buist for a 13–7 lead. Boston College scored on a one-yard rushing touchdown from Mike Holovak to tie the game at 13–13.

In the fourth quarter, Tennessee's Bob Foxx missed a short field goal attempt with three minutes remaining, and BC took over on its own 20-yard-line. Quarterback Charlie O'Rourke led the Eagles on an 80-yard drive, capped with his 24-yard touchdown run to give them a 19–13 win.

As this game was contested before the Sugar Bowl was racially integrated, Boston College played without halfback Lou Montgomery, an African-American. Comments from sportswriters of the era included "there's no use borrowing trouble when it can be avoided." Montgomery had also sat out Boston College's prior bowl game, the 1940 Cotton Bowl Classic, contested in Dallas. The first interracial bowl game did not occur until after World War II, the 1948 Cotton Bowl Classic, and the Sugar Bowl did not integrate until its 1956 edition.
