= Lou Montgomery =

American college sports athlete

- Montgomery during his senior year at Boston College

Profile
- Position: Halfback
- Class: 1941

Personal information
- Born: May 24, 1920
- Died: January 29, 1993 (aged 72); Long Beach, California, U.S.

Career information
- High school: Brockton (MA)
- College: Boston College (1938–1940)

Louis Melvin Montgomery (May 24, 1920 – January 29, 1993) was an American college football player, notable for being the first Black athlete at Boston College and for being unable to play in two bowl games due to racial segregation policies of the era.

== Early life ==
Montgomery, born in 1920, was an All-Scholastic athlete at Brockton High School in Brockton, Massachusetts. At Brockton, he competed in track, football, baseball, and basketball.

In May 1937, Montgomery confirmed reports that he would enroll at Boston College (BC) in Chestnut Hill, Massachusetts. He received a partial scholarship, having turned down an opportunity to attend UCLA. Montgomery began classes in the fall of 1937 as one of three Black students at BC, and the only Black athlete at the school. The school's first Black student, Casper Ferguson, had recently graduated in the spring of 1937. At BC, Montgomery's major was education.

== Boston College athletics ==
Montgomery became the first Black athlete at Boston College. He played on the freshman football team in 1937, as athletic rules of the era prohibited freshmen from playing on varsity teams. He then was a three-time letterman (1938–1940) for the Boston College Eagles football team as a halfback. He also played on the Boston College Eagles baseball team in the spring of 1939.

=== 1938 football season ===
Montgomery made his varsity debut on October 12, 1938, in a game against the Detroit Titans at Fenway Park in Boston. He played infrequently during the season, attributed by coach Gil Dobie to an early-season knee injury. The team posted an overall 6–1–2 record, losing only to Holy Cross in the final game on each team's schedule.

=== 1939 baseball season ===
Montgomery was pressed into service as a catcher, a position he had played in high school, for the BC varsity baseball team in late April 1939, due to both of the team's usual catchers being unavailable. By mid-May he was sideline himself, due to a knee injury.

=== 1939 football season ===
In 1939, Montgomery was a star player on the BC football team. Sportswriters used adjectives like "flashy" and "brilliant" to describe his running ability and his skill at evading anyone trying to tackle him. He was an important part of BC's successful season, and very popular with the fans. But America was segregated at that time, and despite being a key part of the Eagles' offense, whenever BC played against southern teams, even if the game was played up north, Montgomery had been benched. This first occurred for the October 12 home game against Florida, reportedly due to a prior contract signed between the two schools banning the use of "Negro players." This situation was repeated for the November 4 home game facing Auburn. The Eagles completed their regular season with a 9–1 record, their only loss having come in the Florida game.

When BC received its invitation to the 1940 Cotton Bowl Classic, to be played in Dallas, the president of the bowl's athletic association, Curtis Sanford, announced that Montgomery would not be allowed to participate, asserting that keeping him out of the game was "deemed advisable, in view of the general attitude regarding negroes." (Note: Other sources quoted Sanford slightly differently: "In view of the general attitude towards negroes in Texas...".) The story was reported as if Montgomery agreed with the decision, although some fans believed he felt there was no other option but to accept it. Montgomery was praised in the major Boston newspapers for being such a good sport about not playing in the Cotton Bowl.

Years later, some Boston sportswriters had second thoughts, and wondered why they hadn't protested the injustice of a star player being excluded from a bowl game because of his race, but at the time, few of the white sportswriters spoke up. One that did was Lester Rodney; writing in the Chicago-based Daily Worker, he called Sanford a "phony Rhett Butler of the oil fields" and argued that he did not speak for "plain, every day Texans". Sportswriters at Black newspapers were outraged over Montgomery's exclusion from the game. One Boston-based reporter for The Chicago Defender accused coach Frank Leahy of giving in to Jim crow customs and "catering to southern prejudice," charges that Leahy denied. Other Black sportswriters accused Boston College, a Catholic institution, of not living up to its own ideals, by allowing Montgomery to endure discrimination and doing nothing to defend him.

In mid-January 1940, the Veterans of Foreign Wars organization in Boston gave Montgomery an award for "sportsmanship, citizenship, and athletic ability," and praised him for his "self-effacement." Later that month, the Birmingham Post reported that BC would "contract no more contests with teams asking racial discrimination"—however, this did not prevent Montgomery from being forced to sit out additional games during his senior season.

=== 1940 football season ===
Montgomery played in BC's first game of the 1940 season, scoring a touchdown during a 40–0 home win over the Centre Colonels of Kentucky. He was selected to travel with the Eagles to their second game, against Tulane in New Orleans, but after it was reported that his "chances of entering the game are said to be extremely doubtful", he spent the game in the radio booth acting as a spotter assisting the broadcasters. After then playing in multiple BC games against non-southern teams, Montgomery did not play against Auburn on November 23, a 33–7 win for BC at Fenway Park. It was subsequently reported that the two teams had come to an agreement before the contest: BC would not play Montgomery in exchange for Auburn only playing their captain, Dick McGowen, for half of the game. BC finished their regular season with a 10–0 record and were ranked fourth in the final college football rankings, which were released in early December, prior to bowl games. Montgomery was the third-highest scorer on the BC team; his 36 total points from six touchdowns were only behind Frank Maznicki (80 points) and Mike Holovak (67 points) during the regular season.

Montgomery was again unable to play in BC's bowl game, the 1941 Sugar Bowl, contested in New Orleans. Comments from sportswriters of the era included "there's no use borrowing trouble when it can be avoided." BC defeated Tennessee, who also entered the bowl undefeated, by a score of 19–13.

The first interracial bowl game did not occur until after World War II, the 1948 Cotton Bowl Classic, and the Sugar Bowl did not integrate until its 1956 edition.

== Later life ==
In June 1941, Montgomery was appointed to a staff position within the National Youth Administration. At the time, he was married and had one child. By the fall of 1941, Montgomery had organized a semi-professional football team known as the Boston Blackhawks, (Note: Some later sources refer to the team as the Black Eagles rather than Blackhawks.) which played in the New England area. The Blackhawks remained active as late as October 1947.

Montgomery later worked in Hartford, Connecticut, as an insurance agent, and eventually moved to California and worked for Western Airlines. He died on January 29, 1993, in Long Beach, California, aged 72. He was survived by two daughters.

== Legacy ==
Montgomery was inducted to the Varsity Club Hall of Fame at BC in 1997. In 2012, he was added to BC football's list of honored jerseys at Alumni Stadium. (Note: As of 2025, BC football only has two official retired numbers, those of Doug Flutie (22) and Mike Ruth (68). At least 10 other players, including Montgomery, have "honored jerseys".)

In 2015, Montgomery was the subject of a documentary film entitled Lou Montgomery: A Legacy Restored. A sequel, Lou Montgomery: His Story is Our Story, was released in 2023.
