= 1940 Southeastern Conference football season =

- Sport: Football
- Duration: September 21, 1940 – January 1, 1941
- Teams: 13
- Champion: Tennessee

SEC seasons
- 1939 1941

1940 Southeastern Conference football standings
	Conf.					Overall
Team		W		L			W		L
No. 4 Tennessee $	5	–	0	–	0	10	–	1	–	0
No. 9 Mississippi State	4	–	0	–	1	10	–	0	–	1
Ole Miss	3	–	1	–	0	9	–	2	–	0
Alabama	4	–	2	–	0	7	–	2	–	0
Auburn	3	–	2	–	1	6	–	4	–	1
LSU	3	–	3	–	0	6	–	4	–	0
Georgia	2	–	3	–	1	5	–	4	–	1
Florida	2	–	3	–	0	5	–	5	–	0
Kentucky	1	–	2	–	2	5	–	3	–	2
Tulane	1	–	3	–	0	5	–	5	–	0
Vanderbilt	1	–	5	–	1	3	–	6	–	1
Georgia Tech	1	–	5	–	0	3	–	7	–	0
Sewanee	0	–	1	–	0	3	–	5	–	0
$ – Conference champion; Rankings from AP Poll

The 1940 Southeastern Conference football season was the eighth season of college football played by the member schools of the Southeastern Conference (SEC) and was a part of the 1940 college football season. Tennessee compiled an 10–1 overall record, with a conference record of 5–0, and was SEC champion.

== Results and team statistics ==
Conf. rank	Team	Head coach	Overall record	Conf. record	AP final	PPG	PAG
1	Tennessee	Robert Neyland	10–1–0 (.909)	5–0–0 (1.000)	No. 4	30.2	4.1
2	Mississippi State	Allyn McKeen	10–0–1 (.955)	4–0–1 (.900)	No. 9	22.5	5.3
3	Ole Miss	Harry Mehre	9–2–0 (.818)	3–1–0 (.750)		22.8	9.1
4	Alabama	Frank Thomas	7–2–0 (.778)	4–2–0 (.667)		18.4	8.9
5	Auburn	Jack Meagher	6–4–1 (.591)	3–2–1 (.583)		15.5	13.9
6	LSU	Bernie Moore	6–4–0 (.600)	3–3–0 (.500)		13.9	11.2
7	Georgia	Wally Butts	5–4–1 (.550)	2–3–1 (.417)		20.9	13.4
8	Florida	Tom Lieb	5–5–0 (.500)	2–3–0 (.400)		13.6	14.1
9	Kentucky	Albert D. Kirwan	5–3–2 (.600)	1–2–2 (.400)		19.0	10.7
10	Tulane	Red Dawson	5–5–0 (.500)	1–3–0 (.250)		14.4	12.6
11	Vanderbilt	Red Sanders	3–6–1 (.350)	1–5–1 (.214)		10.1	9.8
12	Georgia Tech	William Alexander	3–7–0 (.300)	1–5–0 (.167)		13.9	16.0
13	Sewanee	Harry E. Clark	3–5–0 (.375)	0–1–0 (.000)		16.5	15.6

Key
AP final = Rankings from AP sports writers. See 1940 college football rankings
PPG = Average of points scored per game
PAG = Average of points allowed per game

== Schedule ==
Index to colors and formatting
SEC member won
SEC member lost
SEC member tie
SEC teams in **bold**

=== Week Zero ===
Date	Visiting team	Home team	Site	Result	Attendance	Ref.
September 21	Union (TN)	**Ole Miss**	Hemingway Stadium • Oxford, MS	**W** 37–0		
September 21	Louisiana Tech	**LSU**	Tiger Stadium • Baton Rouge, LA	**W** 39–7		
September 21	Baldwin–Wallace	**Kentucky**	McLean Stadium • Lexington, KY	**W** 59–7		

=== Week One ===
Date	Visiting team	Home team	Site	Result	Attendance	Ref.
September 27	**Alabama**	Spring Hill	Murphy High School Stadium • Mobile, AL	**W** 26–0	7,500	
September 27	Howard (AL)	**Auburn**	Cramton Bowl • Montgomery, AL	**W** 27–13	10,000	
September 27	**Georgia**	Oglethorpe	Ponce de Leon Park • Atlanta, GA	**W** 53–0	25,000	
September 27	**Kentucky**	Xavier	Xavier Stadium • Cincinnati, OH	**W** 13–0	12,000	
September 28	Mercer	**Tennessee**	Shields–Watkins Field • Knoxville, TN	**W** 49–0	20,000	
September 28	Washington & Lee	**Vanderbilt**	Dudley Field • Nashville, TN	**W** 19–0	9,000	
September 28	Boston College	**Tulane**	Tulane Stadium • New Orleans, LA	**L** 7–27	42,000	
September 28	**Mississippi State**	**Florida**	Florida Field • Gainesville, FL	**MSS** 25–7	12,000	
September 28	**Ole Miss**	**LSU**	Tiger Stadium • Baton Rouge, LA (rivalry)	**OM** 19–6		

=== Week Two ===
Date	Visiting team	Home team	Site	Result	Attendance	Ref.
October 5	Duke	**Tennessee**	Shields–Watkins Field • Knoxville, TN	**W** 13–0	25,000	
October 5	Southwestern Louisiana	**Mississippi State**	Scott Field • Starkville, MS	**W** 20–0	7,000	
October 5	**Ole Miss**	Southwestern (TN)	Crump Stadium • Memphis, TN	**W** 27–6	10,000	
October 5	Mercer	**Alabama**	Denny Stadium • Tuscaloosa, AL	**W** 20–0	6,000	
October 5	Holy Cross	**LSU**	Tiger Stadium • Baton Rouge, LA	**W** 25–0		
October 5	**Georgia**	South Carolina	Columbia Municipal Stadium • Columbia, SC (rivalry)	**W** 33–2	15,000	
October 5	**Florida**	Tampa	Phillips Field • Tampa, FL	**W** 23–0		
October 5	Washington and Lee	**Kentucky**	McLean Stadium • Lexington, KY	**W** 47–12	10,000	
October 5	Howard (AL)	**Georgia Tech**	Grant Field • Atlanta, GA	**W** 27–0	15,000	
October 5	Cumberland (TN)	**Sewanee**	Hardee Field • Sewanee, TN	**W** 49–0	1,000	
October 5	**Vanderbilt**	Princeton	Palmer Stadium • Princeton, NJ	**L** 6–7	16,000	
October 5	**Auburn**	**Tulane**	Tulane Stadium • New Orleans, LA (rivalry)	**AUB** 20–14	32,000	

=== Week Three ===
Date	Visiting team	Home team	Site	Result	Attendance	Ref.
October 11	**Florida**	Villanova	Shibe Park • Philadelphia, PA	**L** 0–28	22,000	
October 12	Chattanooga	**Tennessee**	Shields–Watkins Field • Knoxville, TN	**W** 53–0	12,000	
October 12	Howard (AL)	**Alabama**	Denny Stadium • Tuscaloosa, AL	**W** 31–0	4,500	
October 12	Tennessee Tech	**Sewanee**	Hardee Field • Sewanee, TN	**W** 25–6	1,500	
October 12	**LSU**	Rice	Rice Field • Houston, TX	**L** 0–23	23,000	
October 12	**Tulane**	Fordham	Polo Grounds • New York, NY	**L** 7–20	35,400	
October 12	**Georgia Tech**	Notre Dame	Notre Dame Stadium • Notre Dame, IN	**L** 20–26	32,492	
October 12	**Mississippi State**	**Auburn**	Legion Field • Birmingham, AL	**T** 7–7	18,000	
October 12	**Ole Miss**	**Georgia**	Sanford Stadium • Athens, GA	**OM** 28–14	25,000	
October 12	**Kentucky**	**Vanderbilt**	Dudley Field • Nashville, TN	**T** 7–7	15,000	

=== Week Four ===
Date	Visiting team	Home team	Site	Result	Attendance	Ref.
October 19	Howard (AL)	**Mississippi State**	Scott Field • Starkville, MS	**W** 41–7	6,000	
October 19	Duquesne	No. 13 **Ole Miss**	Hemingway Stadium • Oxford, MS	**W** 14–6	15,000	
October 19	Mercer	**LSU**	Tiger Stadium • Baton Rouge, LA	**W** 20–0	10,000	
October 19	Maryland	**Florida**	Florida Field • Gainesville, FL	**W** 19–0	10,000	
October 19	George Washington	**Kentucky**	McLean Stadium • Lexington, KY	**W** 24–0	7,000	
October 19	Rice	**Tulane**	Tulane Stadium • New Orleans, LA	**W** 15–6	34,000	
October 19	**Auburn**	SMU	Cotton Bowl • Dallas, TX	**L** 13–20	10,000	
October 19	**Georgia**	Columbia	Baker Field • New York, NY	**L** 13–14	25,000	
October 19	**Sewanee**	Davidson	Richardson Stadium • Davidson, NC	**L** 20–27	6,000	
October 19	No. 5 **Tennessee**	**Alabama**	Legion Field • Birmingham, AL (rivalry)	**TEN** 27–12	24,500	
October 19	**Vanderbilt**	**Georgia Tech**	Grant Field • Atlanta, GA (rivalry)	**GT** 19–0	20,000	
^{#}Rankings from AP Poll released prior to game.

=== Week Five ===
Date	Visiting team	Home team	Site	Result	Attendance	Ref.
October 25	**Sewanee**	Chattanooga	Chamberlain Field • Chattanooga, TN	**L** 6–20	4,424	
October 25	**Kentucky**	**Georgia**	Sanford Stadium • Athens, GA	**T** 7–7		
October 26	**Mississippi State**	NC State	Riddick Stadium • Raleigh, NC	**W** 26–10	10,000	
October 26	**Tulane**	North Carolina	Kenan Memorial Stadium • Chapel Hill, NC	**W** 14–13	20,000	
October 26	Arkansas	No. 14 **Ole Miss**	Crump Stadium • Memphis, TN (rivalry)	**L** 20–21	15,000	
October 26	**Florida**	No. 5 **Tennessee**	Shields–Watkins Field • Knoxville, TN (rivalry)	**TEN** 14–0	15,000	
October 26	**Auburn**	**Georgia Tech**	Grant Field • Atlanta, GA (rivalry)	**AUB** 16–7	25,000	
October 26	**Vanderbilt**	**LSU**	Tiger Stadium • Baton Rouge, LA	**LSU** 7–0	20,000	
^{#}Rankings from AP Poll released prior to game.

=== Week Six ===
Date	Visiting team	Home team	Site	Result	Attendance	Ref.
November 2	No. 20 **Mississippi State**	Southwestern (TN)	Crump Stadium • Memphis, TN	**W** 13–0	9,000	
November 2	No. 10 Clemson	**Tulane**	Tulane Stadium • New Orleans, LA	**W** 13–0	31,000	
November 2	**Georgia Tech**	No. 18 Duke	Duke Stadium • Durham, NC	**L** 7–41	34,000	
November 2	**Sewanee**	Dartmouth	Memorial Field • Hanover, NH	**L** 0–26		
November 2	**LSU**	No. 7 **Tennessee**	Shields–Watkins Field • Knoxville, TN	**TEN** 28–0	18,000	
November 2	**Ole Miss**	**Vanderbilt**	Dudley Field • Nashville, TN (rivalry)	**OM** 13–7	13,000	
November 2	**Alabama**	**Kentucky**	McLean Stadium • Lexington, KY	**ALA** 25–0	13,000	
November 2	**Auburn**	**Georgia**	Memorial Stadium • Columbus, GA (rivalry)	**UGA** 14–13	20,000	
^{#}Rankings from AP Poll released prior to game.

=== Week Seven ===
Date	Visiting team	Home team	Site	Result	Attendance	Ref.
November 9	No. 5 **Tennessee**	Southwestern (TN)	Crump Stadium • Memphis, TN	**W** 40–0	8,000	
November 9	**Ole Miss**	Holy Cross	Fitton Field • Worcester, MA	**W** 34–7	4,000	
November 9	Clemson	**Auburn**	Auburn Stadium • Auburn, AL (rivalry)	**W** 21–7	12,000	
November 9	No. 19 **Mississippi State**	**LSU**	Tiger Stadium • Baton Rouge, LA (rivalry)	**MSS** 22–7	20,000	
November 9	**Tulane**	**Alabama**	Legion Field • Birmingham, AL	**ALA** 13–6	20,000	
November 9	**Georgia**	**Florida**	Fairfield Stadium • Jacksonville, FL (rivalry)	**FLA** 18–13	19,000	
November 9	**Georgia Tech**	**Kentucky**	DuPont Stadium • Louisville, KY	**KEN** 26–7	14,000	
November 9	**Sewanee**	**Vanderbilt**	Dudley Field • Nashville, TN (rivalry)	**VAN** 20–0	6,500	
^{#}Rankings from AP Poll released prior to game.

=== Week Eight ===
Date	Visiting team	Home team	Site	Result	Attendance	Ref.
November 16	Virginia	No. 5 **Tennessee**	Shields–Watkins Field • Knoxville, TN	**W** 41–14	7,000	
November 16	Millsaps	No. 15 **Mississippi State**	Scott Field • Starkville, MS	**W** 46–13	10,500	
November 16	West Tennessee State	No. 17 **Ole Miss**	Hemingway Stadium • Oxford, MS (rivalry)	**W** 38–7		
November 16	**Florida**	Miami (FL)	Burdine Stadium • Miami, FL (rivalry)	**W** 46–6	17,365	
November 16	Tennessee Tech	**Vanderbilt**	Dudley Field • Nashville, TN	**W** 21–0		
November 16	Washington and Lee	**Sewanee**	Chamberlain Field • Chattanooga, TN	**W** 25–13	1,500	
November 16	**Kentucky**	West Virginia	Mountaineer Field • Morgantown, WV	**L** 7–9	7,500	
November 16	No. 14 **Alabama**	**Georgia Tech**	Grant Field • Atlanta, GA (rivalry)	**ALA** 14–13	25,000	
November 16	**LSU**	**Auburn**	Legion Field • Birmingham, AL (rivalry)	**LSU** 21–13	11,000	
November 16	**Georgia**	**Tulane**	Tulane Stadium • New Orleans, LA	**TUL** 21–13	30,000	
^{#}Rankings from AP Poll released prior to game.

=== Week Nine ===
Date	Visiting team	Home team	Site	Result	Attendance	Ref.
November 23	Louisiana Normal	**Tulane**	Tulane Stadium • New Orleans, LA	**W** 47–0	20,000	
November 23	**Auburn**	No. 4 Boston College	Fenway Park • Boston, MA	**L** 7–33	30,000	
November 23	**Sewanee**	The Citadel	Johnson Hagood Stadium • Charleston, SC	**L** 7–13	2,500	
November 23	**Kentucky**	No. 6 **Tennessee**	Shields–Watkins Field • Knoxville, TN (rivalry)	**TEN** 33–0	25,000	
November 23	No. 11 **Ole Miss**	No. 16 **Mississippi State**	Scott Field • Starkville, MS (rivalry)	**MSS** 19–0	25,000	
November 23	**Vanderbilt**	No. 17 **Alabama**	Legion Field • Birmingham, AL	**ALA** 25–21	14,000	
November 23	**Florida**	**Georgia Tech**	Grant Field • Atlanta, GA	**FLA** 16–7	12,000	
^{#}Rankings from AP Poll released prior to game.

=== Week Ten ===
Date	Visiting team	Home team	Site	Result	Attendance	Ref.
November 29	**Ole Miss**	Miami (FL)	Burdine Stadium • Miami, FL	**W** 21–7	7,518	
November 30	No. 6 **Tennessee**	**Vanderbilt**	Dudley Field • Nashville, TN (rivalry)	**TEN** 20–0	25,000	
November 30	No. 11 **Mississippi State**	No. 17 **Alabama**	Denny Stadium • Tuscaloosa, AL (rivalry)	**MSS** 13–0	18,500	
November 30	**Florida**	**Auburn**	Memorial Stadium • Columbus, GA (rivalry)	**AUB** 20–7	7,500	
November 30	**Tulane**	**LSU**	Tiger Stadium • Baton Rouge, LA (rivalry)	**LSU** 14–0	30,799	
November 30	**Georgia Tech**	**Georgia**	Sanford Stadium • Athens, GA (rivalry)	**UGA** 21–19	30,000	
^{#}Rankings from AP Poll released prior to game.

=== Week Eleven ===
Date	Visiting team	Home team	Site	Result	Attendance	Ref.
December 6	**Georgia**	Miami (FL)	Burdine Stadium • Miami, FL	**W** 28–7	11,860–15,000	
December 7	Villanova	**Auburn**	Cramton Bowl • Montgomery, AL	**W** 13–10	6,500	
December 7	Texas	**Florida**	Florida Field • Gainesville, FL	**L** 0–26	12,000	
^{#}Rankings from AP Poll released prior to game.

=== Postseason ===
Date	Visiting team	Home team	Site	Result	Attendance	Ref.
January 1, 1941	No. 13 Georgetown	No. 9 **Mississippi State**	Burdine Stadium • Miami, FL	**W** 14–7	38,307	
January 1, 1941	No. 5 Boston College	No. 4 **Tennessee**	Tulane Stadium • New Orleans, LA	**L** 13–19	73,181	
^{#}Rankings from AP Poll released prior to game.

== All-conference players ==
The following players were recognized as consensus first-team honors from the Associated Press (AP) and United Press (UP) on the 1940 All-SEC football team:

- Buddy Elrod, End, Mississippi State (AP-1, INS, UP)
- Holt Rast, End, Alabama (AP-1, INS, UP)
- Abe Shires, Tackle, Tennessee (AP-1, INS, UP)
- Bob Suffridge, Guard, Tennessee (AP-1, INS, UP)
- Bob Gude, Center, Vanderbilt (AP-1, INS, UP)
- Bob Foxx. Backfield, Tennessee (AP-1, INS, UP)

== All-Americans ==
One SEC player was a consensus first-team pick on the 1940 College Football All-America Team:

- Bob Suffridge, Guard, Tennessee (AAB, AP, CO, INS, LIB, NEA, NW, SN, UP)

Other SEC players receiving All-American honors from at least one selector were:

- Buddy Elrod, End, Mississippi State (AP-1; LIB; CP-1; NYS-1; NEA-3)
- Bob Ison, End, Georgia Tech (UP-3)
- Holt Rast, End, Alabama (NEA-2; CP-4)
- Abe Shires, Tackle, Tennessee (CP-3; NEA-3)
- Hunter Cohern, Guard, Mississippi State (AP-2)
- Ed Molinski, Guard, Tennessee (SN; UP-3; CP-3; NEA-2)
- George Kinard, Guard, Ole Miss (CP-4)
- John W. Goree, Guard, LSU (CP-4)
- Bob Foxx, Halfback, Tennessee (AP-3; INS-2; CP-4)
- Merle Hapes, Halfback, Ole Miss (UP-3; NEA-3)
- Jimmy Nelson, Halfback, Alabama (CP-2)

== Head coaches ==
Records through the completion of the 1940 season

Team	Head coach	Years at school	Overall record	Record at school	SEC record
Alabama	Frank Thomas	10	102–22–6 (.808)	76–13–5 (.835)	37–8–4 (.796)
Auburn	Jack Meagher	7	64–54–3 (.541)	38–28–8 (.568)	23–18–6 (.553)
Florida	Tom Lieb	1	52–38–4 (.574)	5–5–0 (.500)	2–3–0 (.400)
Georgia	Wally Butts	2	10–10–1 (.500)	10–10–1 (.500)	2–3–1 (.417)
Georgia Tech	William Alexander	21	106–81–15 (.562)	106–81–15 (.562)	20–26–5 (.441)
Kentucky	Albert D. Kirwan	3	13–12–3 (.518)	13–12–3 (.518)	3–8–3 (.321)
LSU	Bernie Moore	6	55–30–4 (.640)	43–18–1 (.702)	22–13–0 (.629)
Mississippi State	Allyn McKeen	2	31–8–1 (.788)	18–2–1 (.881)	7–2–1 (.750)
Ole Miss	Harry Mehre	3	84–40–6 (.669)	25–6–0 (.806)	20–17–2 (.538)
Sewanee	Jenks Gillem	1	69–60–10 (.532)	3–5–0 (.375)	0–1–0 (.000)
Tennessee	Robert Neyland	14	119–16–8 (.860)	119–16–8 (.860)	35–7–2 (.818)
Tulane	Red Dawson	5	31–15–4 (.660)	31–15–4 (.660)	14–10–3 (.574)
Vanderbilt	Red Sanders	1	3–6–1 (.350)	3–6–1 (.350)	1–5–1 (.214)

== 1941 NFL draft ==
The following SEC players were selected in the 1941 NFL draft:

Round	Overall Pick	Player name	School	Position	NFL team
2	14	Abe Shires	Tennessee	Tackle	Cleveland Rams
3	17	Bob Foxx	Tennessee	Back	Chicago Cardinals
3	25	Fred Davis	Alabama	Tackle	Washington Redskins
6	42	Bob Suffridge	Tennessee	Offensive guard	Pittsburgh Steelers
6	45	John Tripson	Mississippi State	Tackle	Detroit Lions
6	48	Tommy O'Boyle	Tulane	Offensive guard	Chicago Bears
6	50	Ed Cifers	Tennessee	End	Washington Redskins
7	51	Julius Battista	Florida	Guard	Philadelphia Eagles
7	58	Hal Newman	Alabama	End	Brooklyn Dodgers
9	73	Buddy Elrod	Mississippi State	End	Pittsburgh Steelers
10	90	Ed Hickerson	Alabama	Guard	Washington Redskins
11	99	Jim Hardin	Kentucky	End	Chicago Bears
12	105	Billy Jefferson	Mississippi State	Back	Detroit Lions
12	109	Harvey Johnson	Mississippi State	Back	Brooklyn Dodgers
13	118	George Kinard	Ole Miss	Guard	Brooklyn Dodgers
14	121	Les Dodson	Ole Miss	Back	Philadelphia Eagles
14	122	J. W. Goree	LSU	Guard	Pittsburgh Steelers
14	127	Arnie Moore	Mississippi State	End	New York Giants
14	129	Lloyd Cheatham	Auburn	Back	Brooklyn Dodgers
15	133	John Eibner	Kentucky	Tackle	Pittsburgh Steelers
17	158	Dick McGowen	Auburn	Back	Brooklyn Dodgers
18	165	Charlie Ishmael	Kentucky	Back	Detroit Lions
20	184	Leo Barnes	LSU	Tackle	Cleveland Rams
20	190	Ed Hiestand	Vanderbilt	End	Washington Redskins
21	192	Joe Bailey	Kentucky	Center	Green Bay Packers
21	194	Hunter Corbern	Mississippi State	Guard	Chicago Bears
