= 1940 Florida Gators football team =

American college football season

1940 Florida Gators football
- Conference: Southeastern Conference
- Record: 5–5 (2–3 SEC)
- Head coach: Tom Lieb (1st season)
- Captain: Bud Walton
- Home stadium: Florida Field

1940 Southeastern Conference football standings
	Conf.					Overall
Team		W		L			W		L
No. 4 Tennessee $	5	–	0	–	0	10	–	1	–	0
No. 9 Mississippi State	4	–	0	–	1	10	–	0	–	1
Ole Miss	3	–	1	–	0	9	–	2	–	0
Alabama	4	–	2	–	0	7	–	2	–	0
Auburn	3	–	2	–	1	6	–	4	–	1
LSU	3	–	3	–	0	6	–	4	–	0
Georgia	2	–	3	–	1	5	–	4	–	1
Florida	2	–	3	–	0	5	–	5	–	0
Kentucky	1	–	2	–	2	5	–	3	–	2
Tulane	1	–	3	–	0	5	–	5	–	0
Vanderbilt	1	–	5	–	1	3	–	6	–	1
Georgia Tech	1	–	5	–	0	3	–	7	–	0
Sewanee	0	–	1	–	0	3	–	5	–	0
$ – Conference champion; Rankings from AP Poll

The 1940 Florida Gators football team represented the University of Florida during the 1940 college football season. The season was the first of four for Tom Lieb as the head coach of the Florida Gators football team. Lieb was the former coach of the Loyola Lions, and had previously served as Knute Rockne's primary assistant and on-the-field replacement while Rockne was in the hospital during most of the Notre Dame Fighting Irish's 1930 national championship season. The highlights of the Gators' 1940 season included victories over the Maryland Terrapins (19–0), the Georgia Bulldogs (18–13), the Miami Hurricanes (46–6) and the Georgia Tech Yellow Jackets (16–7). Lieb's 1940 Florida Gators finished with a 5–5 overall record and a 2–3 record in the Southeastern Conference (SEC), placing eighth among thirteen SEC teams.

Florida was ranked at No. 64 (out of 697 college football teams) in the final rankings under the Litkenhous Difference by Score system for 1940.

== Schedule ==
Date	Time	Opponent	Site	Result	Attendance	Source
September 28		Mississippi State	Florida Field; Gainesville, FL	L 7–25	12,000	
October 5		at Tampa*	Phillips Field; Tampa, FL	W 23–0		
October 11		at Villanova*	Shibe Park; Philadelphia, PA	L 0–28	22,000	
October 19		Maryland*^{†}	Florida Field; Gainesville, FL	W 19–0	10,000	
October 26		at No. 5 Tennessee	Shields–Watkins Field; Knoxville, TN (rivalry)	L 0–14	15,000	
November 9		vs. Georgia	Fairfield Stadium; Jacksonville, FL (rivalry)	W 18–13	19,000	
November 16	8:30 p.m.	at Miami (FL)*	Burdine Stadium; Miami, FL (rivalry)	W 46–6	17,365	
November 23		at Georgia Tech	Grant Field; Atlanta, GA	W 16–7	12,000	
November 30		vs. Auburn	Memorial Stadium; Columbus, GA (rivalry)	L 7–20	7,500	
December 7		Texas*	Florida Field; Gainesville, FL	L 0–26	12,000	
*Non-conference game; ^{†}Homecoming; Rankings from AP Poll released prior to the game; All times are in Eastern time
