= 1940 Ole Miss Rebels football team =

American college football season

1940 Ole Miss Rebels football
- Conference: Southeastern Conference
- Record: 9–2 (3–1 SEC)
- Head coach: Harry Mehre (3rd season)
- Captain: George Kinard
- Home stadium: Hemingway Stadium

1940 Southeastern Conference football standings
	Conf.					Overall
Team		W		L			W		L
No. 4 Tennessee $	5	–	0	–	0	10	–	1	–	0
No. 9 Mississippi State	4	–	0	–	1	10	–	0	–	1
Ole Miss	3	–	1	–	0	9	–	2	–	0
Alabama	4	–	2	–	0	7	–	2	–	0
Auburn	3	–	2	–	1	6	–	4	–	1
LSU	3	–	3	–	0	6	–	4	–	0
Georgia	2	–	3	–	1	5	–	4	–	1
Florida	2	–	3	–	0	5	–	5	–	0
Kentucky	1	–	2	–	2	5	–	3	–	2
Tulane	1	–	3	–	0	5	–	5	–	0
Vanderbilt	1	–	5	–	1	3	–	6	–	1
Georgia Tech	1	–	5	–	0	3	–	7	–	0
Sewanee	0	–	1	–	0	3	–	5	–	0
$ – Conference champion; Rankings from AP Poll

The 1940 Ole Miss Rebels football team represented the University of Mississippi in the 1940 college football season. The Rebels were led by third-year head coach Harry Mehre and played their home games at Hemingway Stadium in Oxford, Mississippi. They finished with a record of 9–2 (3–1 SEC), to finish third in the Southeastern Conference.

Ole Miss was ranked at No. 23 (out of 697 college football teams) in the final rankings under the Litkenhous Difference by Score system for 1940.

== Schedule ==
Date	Time	Opponent	Rank	Site	Result	Attendance	Source
September 21	2:30 p.m.	Union (TN)*		Hemingway Stadium; Oxford, MS	W 37–0		
September 28		at LSU		Tiger Stadium; Baton Rouge, LA (rivalry)	W 19–6		
October 5		at Southwestern (TN)*		Crump Stadium; Memphis, TN	W 27–6	10,000	
October 12		at Georgia		Sanford Stadium; Athens, GA	W 28–14	25,000	
October 19		Duquesne*	No. 13	Hemingway Stadium; Oxford, MS	W 14–6	15,000	
October 26		vs. Arkansas*	No. 14	Crump Stadium; Memphis, TN (rivalry)	L 20–21	15,000	
November 2		at Vanderbilt		Dudley Field; Nashville, TN (rivalry)	W 13–7	13,000	
November 9		at Holy Cross*		Fitton Field; Worcester, MA	W 34–7	4,000	
November 16		West Tennessee State*	No. 17	Hemingway Stadium; Oxford, MS (rivalry)	W 38–7		
November 23		at No. 16 Mississippi State	No. 11	Scott Field; Starkville, MS (Egg Bowl)	L 0–19	25,000	
November 29		at Miami (FL)*		Burdine Stadium; Miami, FL	W 21–7	7,518	
*Non-conference game; Rankings from AP Poll released prior to the game; All times are in Central time

== Rankings ==
Ranking movements Legend: ██ Increase in ranking ██ Decrease in ranking — = Not ranked т = Tied with team above or below ( ) = First-place votes
	Week							
Poll	1	2	3	4	5	6	7	Final
AP	13	14 (1)	—	—	17т	11	—	—
