= 1940 Auburn Tigers football team =

American college football season

1940 Auburn Tigers football
- Conference: Southeastern Conference
- Record: 6–4–1 (3–2–1 SEC)
- Head coach: Jack Meagher (7th season)
- Home stadium: Auburn Stadium; Legion Field; Cramton Bowl

1940 Southeastern Conference football standings
	Conf.					Overall
Team		W		L			W		L
No. 4 Tennessee $	5	–	0	–	0	10	–	1	–	0
No. 9 Mississippi State	4	–	0	–	1	10	–	0	–	1
Ole Miss	3	–	1	–	0	9	–	2	–	0
Alabama	4	–	2	–	0	7	–	2	–	0
Auburn	3	–	2	–	1	6	–	4	–	1
LSU	3	–	3	–	0	6	–	4	–	0
Georgia	2	–	3	–	1	5	–	4	–	1
Florida	2	–	3	–	0	5	–	5	–	0
Kentucky	1	–	2	–	2	5	–	3	–	2
Tulane	1	–	3	–	0	5	–	5	–	0
Vanderbilt	1	–	5	–	1	3	–	6	–	1
Georgia Tech	1	–	5	–	0	3	–	7	–	0
Sewanee	0	–	1	–	0	3	–	5	–	0
$ – Conference champion; Rankings from AP Poll

The 1940 Auburn Tigers football team represented Auburn University in the 1940 college football season. The Tigers' were led by head coach Jack Meagher in his seventh season and finished the season with a record of six wins, four losses and one tie (6–4–1 overall, 3–2–1 in the SEC).

Auburn was ranked at No. 31 (out of 697 college football teams) in the final rankings under the Litkenhous Difference by Score system for 1940.

== Schedule ==
Date	Opponent	Site	Result	Attendance	Source
September 27	Howard (AL)*	Cramton Bowl; Montgomery, AL	W 27–13	10,000	
October 5	at Tulane	Tulane Stadium; New Orleans, LA (rivalry)	W 20–14	32,000	
October 12	Mississippi State	Legion Field; Birmingham, AL	T 7–7	18,000	
October 19	at SMU*	Cotton Bowl; Dallas, TX	L 13–20	10,000	
October 26	at Georgia Tech	Grant Field; Atlanta, GA (rivalry)	W 16–7	25,000	
November 2	vs. Georgia	Memorial Stadium; Columbus, GA (rivalry)	L 13–14	20,000	
November 9	Clemson*^{†}	Auburn Stadium; Auburn, AL (rivalry)	W 21–7	12,000	
November 16	LSU	Legion Field; Birmingham, AL (rivalry)	L 13–21	11,000	
November 23	at No. 4 Boston College*	Fenway Park; Boston, MA	L 7–33	30,000	
November 30	vs. Florida	Memorial Stadium; Columbus, GA (rivalry)	W 20–7	7,500	
December 7	Villanova*	Cramton Bowl; Montgomery, AL	W 13–10	6,500	
*Non-conference game; ^{†}Homecoming; Rankings from AP Poll released prior to the game
