= 1940 Mississippi State Maroons football team =

American college football season

1940 Mississippi State Maroons football

Orange Bowl champion

Orange Bowl, W 14–7 vs. Georgetown
- Conference: Southeastern Conference

Ranking
- AP: No. 9
- Record: 10–0–1 (4–0–1 SEC)
- Head coach: Allyn McKeen (2nd season)
- Home stadium: Scott Field

1940 Southeastern Conference football standings
	Conf.					Overall
Team		W		L			W		L
No. 4 Tennessee $	5	–	0	–	0	10	–	1	–	0
No. 9 Mississippi State	4	–	0	–	1	10	–	0	–	1
Ole Miss	3	–	1	–	0	9	–	2	–	0
Alabama	4	–	2	–	0	7	–	2	–	0
Auburn	3	–	2	–	1	6	–	4	–	1
LSU	3	–	3	–	0	6	–	4	–	0
Georgia	2	–	3	–	1	5	–	4	–	1
Florida	2	–	3	–	0	5	–	5	–	0
Kentucky	1	–	2	–	2	5	–	3	–	2
Tulane	1	–	3	–	0	5	–	5	–	0
Vanderbilt	1	–	5	–	1	3	–	6	–	1
Georgia Tech	1	–	5	–	0	3	–	7	–	0
Sewanee	0	–	1	–	0	3	–	5	–	0
$ – Conference champion; Rankings from AP Poll

The 1940 Mississippi State Maroons football team was an American football team that represented Mississippi State College (now known as Mississippi State University) as a member of the Southeastern Conference (SEC) during the 1940 college football season. In their second year under head coach Allyn McKeen, the Maroons compiled an overall record of 10–0–1, with a conference record of 4–0–1, and finished second in the SEC. This was Mississippi State's only undefeated season.

End Buddy Elrod was named SEC "Player of the Year" by the Nashville Banner and was selected to several All-America teams.

== Schedule ==
Date	Opponent	Rank	Site	Result	Attendance	Source
September 28	at Florida		Florida Field; Gainesville, FL	W 25–7	12,000	
October 5	Southwestern Louisiana*		Scott Field; Starkville, MS	W 20–0	7,000	
October 12	at Auburn		Legion Field; Birmingham, AL	T 7–7	18,000	
October 19	Howard (AL)*		Scott Field; Starkville, MS	W 41–7	6,000	
October 26	at NC State*		Riddick Stadium; Raleigh, NC	W 26–10	10,000	
November 2	at Southwestern (TN)*	No. 20	Crump Stadium; Memphis, TN	W 13–0	9,000	
November 9	at LSU	No. 19	Tiger Stadium; Baton Rouge, LA (rivalry)	W 22–7	20,000	
November 16	Millsaps*	No. 15	Scott Field; Starkville, MS	W 46–13	10,500	
November 23	No. 11 Ole Miss	No. 16	Scott Field; Starkville, MS (Egg Bowl)	W 19–0	25,000	
November 30	at No. 17 Alabama	No. 11	Denny Stadium; Tuscaloosa, AL (rivalry)	W 13–0	18,500	
January 1	vs. No. 13 Georgetown*	No. 9	Burdine Stadium; Miami, FL (Orange Bowl)	W 14–7	38,307	
*Non-conference game; Rankings from AP Poll released prior to the game

== Rankings ==
Ranking movements Legend: ██ Increase in ranking ██ Decrease in ranking — = Not ranked т = Tied with team above or below ( ) = First-place votes
	Week							
Poll	1	2	3	4	5	6	7	Final
AP	—	—	20т	19т	15	16	11	9 (1)
