= 1940 LSU Tigers football team =

American college football season

1940 LSU Tigers football
- Conference: Southeastern Conference
- Record: 6–4 (3–3 SEC)
- Head coach: Bernie Moore (6th season)
- Home stadium: Tiger Stadium

1940 Southeastern Conference football standings
	Conf.					Overall
Team		W		L			W		L
No. 4 Tennessee $	5	–	0	–	0	10	–	1	–	0
No. 9 Mississippi State	4	–	0	–	1	10	–	0	–	1
Ole Miss	3	–	1	–	0	9	–	2	–	0
Alabama	4	–	2	–	0	7	–	2	–	0
Auburn	3	–	2	–	1	6	–	4	–	1
LSU	3	–	3	–	0	6	–	4	–	0
Georgia	2	–	3	–	1	5	–	4	–	1
Florida	2	–	3	–	0	5	–	5	–	0
Kentucky	1	–	2	–	2	5	–	3	–	2
Tulane	1	–	3	–	0	5	–	5	–	0
Vanderbilt	1	–	5	–	1	3	–	6	–	1
Georgia Tech	1	–	5	–	0	3	–	7	–	0
Sewanee	0	–	1	–	0	3	–	5	–	0
$ – Conference champion; Rankings from AP Poll

The 1940 LSU Tigers football team was an American football team that represented Louisiana State University (LSU) as a member of the Southeastern Conference (SEC) during the 1940 college football season. In their sixth year under head coach Bernie Moore, the Tigers compiled an overall record of 6–4, with a conference record of 3–3, and finished sixth in the SEC.

LSU was ranked at No. 33 (out of 697 college football teams) in the final rankings under the Litkenhous Difference by Score system for 1940.

== Schedule ==
Date	Opponent	Site	Result	Attendance	Source
September 21	Louisiana Tech*	Tiger Stadium; Baton Rouge, LA	W 39–7		
September 28	Ole Miss	Tiger Stadium; Baton Rouge, LA (rivalry)	L 6–19		
October 5	Holy Cross*	Tiger Stadium; Baton Rouge, LA	W 25–0		
October 12	at Rice*	Rice Field; Houston, TX	L 0–23	23,000	
October 19	Mercer*	Tiger Stadium; Baton Rouge, LA	W 20–0	10,000	
October 26	Vanderbilt^{†}	Tiger Stadium; Baton Rouge, LA	W 7–0	20,000	
November 2	at No. 7 Tennessee	Shields–Watkins Field; Knoxville, TN	L 0–28	18,000	
November 9	No. 19 Mississippi State	Tiger Stadium; Baton Rouge, LA (rivalry)	L 7–22	25,000	
November 16	at Auburn	Legion Field; Birmingham, AL (rivalry)	W 21–13	11,000	
November 30	Tulane	Tiger Stadium; Baton Rouge, LA (Battle for the Rag)	W 14–0	30,799	
*Non-conference game; ^{†}Homecoming; Rankings from AP Poll released prior to the game
