= 1940 Georgia Bulldogs football team =

American college football season

1940 Georgia Bulldogs football
- Conference: Southeastern Conference
- Record: 5–4–1 (2–3–1 SEC)
- Head coach: Wally Butts (2nd season)
- Home stadium: Sanford Stadium

1940 Southeastern Conference football standings
	Conf.					Overall
Team		W		L			W		L
No. 4 Tennessee $	5	–	0	–	0	10	–	1	–	0
No. 9 Mississippi State	4	–	0	–	1	10	–	0	–	1
Ole Miss	3	–	1	–	0	9	–	2	–	0
Alabama	4	–	2	–	0	7	–	2	–	0
Auburn	3	–	2	–	1	6	–	4	–	1
LSU	3	–	3	–	0	6	–	4	–	0
Georgia	2	–	3	–	1	5	–	4	–	1
Florida	2	–	3	–	0	5	–	5	–	0
Kentucky	1	–	2	–	2	5	–	3	–	2
Tulane	1	–	3	–	0	5	–	5	–	0
Vanderbilt	1	–	5	–	1	3	–	6	–	1
Georgia Tech	1	–	5	–	0	3	–	7	–	0
Sewanee	0	–	1	–	0	3	–	5	–	0
$ – Conference champion; Rankings from AP Poll

The 1940 Georgia Bulldogs football team was an American football team that represented the University of Georgia as a member of the Southeastern Conference (SEC) during the 1940 college football season. In their second year under head coach Wally Butts, the Bulldogs compiled an overall record of 5–4–1, with a conference record of 2–3–1, and finished 7th in the SEC.

Georgia was ranked at No. 53 (out of 697 college football teams) in the final rankings under the Litkenhous Difference by Score system for 1940.

== Schedule ==
Date	Opponent	Site	Result	Attendance	Source
September 27	at Oglethorpe*	Ponce de Leon Park; Atlanta, GA	W 53–0	25,000	
October 5	at South Carolina*	Columbia Municipal Stadium; Columbia, SC (rivalry)	W 33–2	15,000	
October 12	Ole Miss	Sanford Stadium; Athens, GA	L 14–28	25,000	
October 19	at Columbia*	Baker Field; New York, NY	L 13–14	25,000	
October 25	Kentucky	Sanford Stadium; Athens, GA	T 7–7		
November 2	vs. Auburn	Memorial Stadium; Columbus, GA (rivalry)	W 14–13	20,000	
November 9	vs. Florida	Fairfield Stadium; Jacksonville, FL (rivalry)	L 13–18	19,000	
November 16	at Tulane	Tulane Stadium; New Orleans, LA	L 13–21	30,000	
November 30	Georgia Tech^{†}	Sanford Stadium; Athens, GA (rivalry)	W 21–19	30,000	
December 6	at Miami (FL)*	Burdine Stadium; Miami, FL	W 28–7	11,860–15,000	
*Non-conference game; ^{†}Homecoming
