= 1940 Tulane Green Wave football team =

American college football season

1940 Tulane Green Wave football
- Conference: Southeastern Conference
- Record: 5–5 (1–3 SEC)
- Head coach: Red Dawson (5th season)
- Captains: Claude Groves; Tommy O'Boyle
- Home stadium: Tulane Stadium

1940 Southeastern Conference football standings
	Conf.					Overall
Team		W		L			W		L
No. 4 Tennessee $	5	–	0	–	0	10	–	1	–	0
No. 9 Mississippi State	4	–	0	–	1	10	–	0	–	1
Ole Miss	3	–	1	–	0	9	–	2	–	0
Alabama	4	–	2	–	0	7	–	2	–	0
Auburn	3	–	2	–	1	6	–	4	–	1
LSU	3	–	3	–	0	6	–	4	–	0
Georgia	2	–	3	–	1	5	–	4	–	1
Florida	2	–	3	–	0	5	–	5	–	0
Kentucky	1	–	2	–	2	5	–	3	–	2
Tulane	1	–	3	–	0	5	–	5	–	0
Vanderbilt	1	–	5	–	1	3	–	6	–	1
Georgia Tech	1	–	5	–	0	3	–	7	–	0
Sewanee	0	–	1	–	0	3	–	5	–	0
$ – Conference champion; Rankings from AP Poll

The 1940 Tulane Green Wave football team was an American football team that represented Tulane University as a member of the Southeastern Conference (SEC) during the 1940 college football season. In its fifth year under head coach Red Dawson, Tulane compiled a 5–5 record (1–3 in conference games), finished tenth in the SEC, and outscored opponents by a total of 144 to 126. Tulane was ranked at No. 28 out of 697 college football teams in the final rankings under the Litkenhous Difference by Score system for 1940.

Back James Thibault and tackle Charles Dufour received first-team honors on the 1940 All-SEC football team.

The Green Wave played its home games at Tulane Stadium in New Orleans.

== Schedule ==
Date	Time	Opponent	Site	Result	Attendance	Source
September 28		Boston College*	Tulane Stadium; New Orleans, LA	L 7–27	42,000	
October 5		Auburn	Tulane Stadium; New Orleans, LA (rivalry)	L 14–20	32,000	
October 12		at Fordham*	Polo Grounds; New York, NY	L 7–20	35,400	
October 19		Rice*	Tulane Stadium; New Orleans, LA	W 15–6	34,000	
October 26		at North Carolina*	Kenan Memorial Stadium; Chapel Hill, NC	W 14–13	20,000	
November 2		No. 10 Clemson*	Tulane Stadium; New Orleans, LA	W 13–0	31,000	
November 9		at Alabama	Legion Field; Birmingham, AL	L 6–13	20,000	
November 16		Georgia	Tulane Stadium; New Orleans, LA	W 21–13	30,000	
November 23	2:00 p.m.	Louisiana Normal*	Tulane Stadium; New Orleans, LA	W 47–0	20,000	
November 30		at LSU	Tiger Stadium; Baton Rouge, LA (Battle for the Rag)	L 0–14	30,799	
*Non-conference game; Rankings from AP Poll released prior to the game; All times are in Central time
