= 1940 Sewanee Tigers football team =

American college football season

1940 Sewanee Tigers football
- Conference: Southeastern Conference
- Record: 3–5 (0–1 SEC)
- Head coach: Jenks Gillem (1st season)
- Home stadium: Hardee Field

1940 Southeastern Conference football standings
	Conf.					Overall
Team		W		L			W		L
No. 4 Tennessee $	5	–	0	–	0	10	–	1	–	0
No. 9 Mississippi State	4	–	0	–	1	10	–	0	–	1
Ole Miss	3	–	1	–	0	9	–	2	–	0
Alabama	4	–	2	–	0	7	–	2	–	0
Auburn	3	–	2	–	1	6	–	4	–	1
LSU	3	–	3	–	0	6	–	4	–	0
Georgia	2	–	3	–	1	5	–	4	–	1
Florida	2	–	3	–	0	5	–	5	–	0
Kentucky	1	–	2	–	2	5	–	3	–	2
Tulane	1	–	3	–	0	5	–	5	–	0
Vanderbilt	1	–	5	–	1	3	–	6	–	1
Georgia Tech	1	–	5	–	0	3	–	7	–	0
Sewanee	0	–	1	–	0	3	–	5	–	0
$ – Conference champion; Rankings from AP Poll

The 1940 Sewanee Tigers football team was an American football team that represented Sewanee: The University of the South as a member of the Southeastern Conference during the 1940 college football season. In their first season under head coach Jenks Gillem, Sewanee compiled a 3–5 record.

Sewanee was ranked at No. 157 (out of 697 college football teams) in the final rankings under the Litkenhous Difference by Score system for 1940.

== Schedule ==
Date	Opponent	Site	Result	Attendance	Source
October 5	Cumberland (TN)*	Hardee Field; Sewanee, TN	W 49–0	1,000	
October 12	Tennessee Tech*	Hardee Field; Sewanee, TN	W 25–6	1,500	
October 19	at Davidson*	Richardson Stadium; Davidson, NC	L 20–27	6,000	
October 25	at Chattanooga*	Chamberlain Field; Chattanooga, TN	L 6–20	4,424	
November 2	at Dartmouth*	Memorial Field; Hanover, NH	L 0–26		
November 9	at Vanderbilt	Dudley Field; Nashville, TN (rivalry)	L 0–20	6,500	
November 16	Washington and Lee*	Chamberlain Field; Chattanooga, TN	W 25–13	1,500	
November 23	at The Citadel*	Johnson Hagood Stadium; Charleston, SC	L 7–13	2,500	
*Non-conference game
