= 1940 Georgia Tech Yellow Jackets football team =

American college football season

1940 Georgia Tech Yellow Jackets football
- Conference: Southeastern Conference
- Record: 3–7 (1–5 SEC)
- Head coach: William Alexander (21st season)
- Captain: Neil M. "Hawk" Cavette
- Home stadium: Grant Field

1940 Southeastern Conference football standings
	Conf.					Overall
Team		W		L			W		L
No. 4 Tennessee $	5	–	0	–	0	10	–	1	–	0
No. 9 Mississippi State	4	–	0	–	1	10	–	0	–	1
Ole Miss	3	–	1	–	0	9	–	2	–	0
Alabama	4	–	2	–	0	7	–	2	–	0
Auburn	3	–	2	–	1	6	–	4	–	1
LSU	3	–	3	–	0	6	–	4	–	0
Georgia	2	–	3	–	1	5	–	4	–	1
Florida	2	–	3	–	0	5	–	5	–	0
Kentucky	1	–	2	–	2	5	–	3	–	2
Tulane	1	–	3	–	0	5	–	5	–	0
Vanderbilt	1	–	5	–	1	3	–	6	–	1
Georgia Tech	1	–	5	–	0	3	–	7	–	0
Sewanee	0	–	1	–	0	3	–	5	–	0
$ – Conference champion; Rankings from AP Poll

The 1940 Georgia Tech Yellow Jackets football team was an American football team that represented Georgia Tech as a member of the Southeastern Conference (SEC) during the 1940 college football season. In their 21st year under head coach William Alexander, the Yellow Jackets compiled an overall record of 3–7, with a conference record of 1–5, and finished 12th in the SEC.

Georgia Tech was ranked at No. 59 (out of 697 college football teams) in the final rankings under the Litkenhous Difference by Score system for 1940.

== Schedule ==
Date	Opponent	Site	Result	Attendance	Source
October 5	Howard (AL)*	Grant Field; Atlanta, GA	W 27–0	15,000	
October 12	at Notre Dame*	Notre Dame Stadium; Notre Dame, IN (rivalry)	L 20–26	32,492	
October 19	Vanderbilt	Grant Field; Atlanta, GA (rivalry)	W 19–0	20,000	
October 26	Auburn	Grant Field; Atlanta, GA (rivalry)	L 7–16	25,000	
November 2	at No. 18 Duke*	Duke Stadium; Durham, NC	L 7–41	34,000	
November 9	at Kentucky	DuPont Stadium; Louisville, KY	L 7–26	14,000	
November 16	No. 14 Alabama	Grant Field; Atlanta, GA (rivalry)	L 13–14	25,000	
November 23	Florida	Grant Field; Atlanta, GA	L 7–16	12,000	
November 30	at Georgia	Sanford Stadium; Athens, GA (rivalry)	L 19–21	30,000	
December 28	California*	Grant Field; Atlanta, GA	W 13–0	7,000	
*Non-conference game; Rankings from AP Poll released prior to the game
