= 1940 Kentucky Wildcats football team =

American college football season

1940 Kentucky Wildcats football
- Conference: Southeastern Conference
- Record: 5–3–2 (1–2–2 SEC)
- Head coach: Albert D. Kirwan (3rd season)
- Captain: John Eibner
- Home stadium: McLean Stadium

1940 Southeastern Conference football standings
	Conf.					Overall
Team		W		L			W		L
No. 4 Tennessee $	5	–	0	–	0	10	–	1	–	0
No. 9 Mississippi State	4	–	0	–	1	10	–	0	–	1
Ole Miss	3	–	1	–	0	9	–	2	–	0
Alabama	4	–	2	–	0	7	–	2	–	0
Auburn	3	–	2	–	1	6	–	4	–	1
LSU	3	–	3	–	0	6	–	4	–	0
Georgia	2	–	3	–	1	5	–	4	–	1
Florida	2	–	3	–	0	5	–	5	–	0
Kentucky	1	–	2	–	2	5	–	3	–	2
Tulane	1	–	3	–	0	5	–	5	–	0
Vanderbilt	1	–	5	–	1	3	–	6	–	1
Georgia Tech	1	–	5	–	0	3	–	7	–	0
Sewanee	0	–	1	–	0	3	–	5	–	0
$ – Conference champion; Rankings from AP Poll

The 1940 Kentucky Wildcats football team was an American football team that represented the University of Kentucky as a member of the Southeastern Conference (SEC) during the 1940 college football season. In their third season under head coach Albert D. Kirwan, the Wildcats compiled an overall record of 5–3–2 with a mark of 1–2–2 against conference opponents, finished in ninth place in the SEC, and outscored opponents by a total of 190 to 107.

Kentucky was ranked at No. 44 (out of 697 college football teams) in the final rankings under the Litkenhous Difference by Score system for 1940.

== Schedule ==
Date	Opponent	Site	Result	Attendance	Source
September 21	Baldwin–Wallace*	Stoll Field/McLean Stadium; Lexington, KY	W 59–7		
September 27	at Xavier*	Xavier Stadium; Cincinnati, OH	W 13–0	12,000	
October 5	Washington and Lee*	Stoll Field/McLean Stadium; Lexington, KY	W 47–12	10,000	
October 12	at Vanderbilt	Dudley Field; Nashville, TN (rivalry)	T 7–7	15,000	
October 19	George Washington*	Stoll Field/McLean Stadium; Lexington, KY	W 24–0	7,000	
October 25	at Georgia	Sanford Stadium; Athens, GA	T 7–7		
November 2	Alabama	Stoll Field/McLean Stadium; Lexington, KY	L 0–25	13,000	
November 9	Georgia Tech	DuPont Stadium; Louisville, KY	W 26–7	14,000	
November 16	at West Virginia*	Mountaineer Field; Morgantown, WV	L 7–9	7,500	
November 23	at No. 6 Tennessee	Shields–Watkins Field; Knoxville, TN (rivalry)	L 0–33	25,000	
*Non-conference game; Rankings from AP Poll released prior to the game
