= 1940 Vanderbilt Commodores football team =

American college football season

1940 Vanderbilt Commodores football
- Conference: Southeastern Conference
- Record: 3–6–1 (1–5–1 SEC)
- Head coach: Red Sanders (1st season)
- Offensive scheme: Single-wing
- Captain: John Ellis
- Home stadium: Dudley Field

1940 Southeastern Conference football standings
	Conf.					Overall
Team		W		L			W		L
No. 4 Tennessee $	5	–	0	–	0	10	–	1	–	0
No. 9 Mississippi State	4	–	0	–	1	10	–	0	–	1
Ole Miss	3	–	1	–	0	9	–	2	–	0
Alabama	4	–	2	–	0	7	–	2	–	0
Auburn	3	–	2	–	1	6	–	4	–	1
LSU	3	–	3	–	0	6	–	4	–	0
Georgia	2	–	3	–	1	5	–	4	–	1
Florida	2	–	3	–	0	5	–	5	–	0
Kentucky	1	–	2	–	2	5	–	3	–	2
Tulane	1	–	3	–	0	5	–	5	–	0
Vanderbilt	1	–	5	–	1	3	–	6	–	1
Georgia Tech	1	–	5	–	0	3	–	7	–	0
Sewanee	0	–	1	–	0	3	–	5	–	0
$ – Conference champion; Rankings from AP Poll

The 1940 Vanderbilt Commodores football team represented Vanderbilt University during the 1940 college football season. The Commodores were led by Red Sanders, in his first season as head coach. Members of the Southeastern Conference, Vanderbilt went 3–6–1 overall and 1–5–1 in conference play.

Vanderbilt was ranked at No. 63 (out of 697 college football teams) in the final rankings under the Litkenhous Difference by Score system for 1940.

The Commodores played their seven home games at Dudley Field in Nashville, Tennessee.

== Schedule ==
Date	Time	Opponent	Site	Result	Attendance	Source
September 28		Washington & Lee*	Dudley Field; Nashville, TN	W 19–0	9,000	
October 5		at Princeton*	Palmer Stadium; Princeton, NJ	L 6–7	16,000	
October 12		Kentucky	Dudley Field; Nashville, TN (rivalry)	T 7–7	15,000	
October 19		at Georgia Tech	Grant Field; Atlanta, GA (rivalry)	L 0–19	20,000	
October 26		at LSU	Tiger Stadium; Baton Rouge, LA	L 0–7	20,000	
November 2		Ole Miss	Dudley Field; Nashville, TN (rivalry)	L 7–13	13,000	
November 9		Sewanee	Dudley Field; Nashville, TN (rivalry)	W 20–0	6,500	
November 16	2:00 p.m.	Tennessee Tech*	Dudley Field; Nashville, TN	W 21–0	4,000	
November 23		No. 17 Alabama	Legion Field; Birmingham, AL	L 21–25	14,000	
November 30		No. 6 Tennessee	Dudley Field; Nashville, TN (rivalry)	L 0–20	25,000	
*Non-conference game; Rankings from AP Poll released prior to the game; All times are in Central time
