= 1940 Alabama Crimson Tide football team =

American college football season

1940 Alabama Crimson Tide football
- Conference: Southeastern Conference
- Record: 7–2 (4–2 SEC)
- Head coach: Frank Thomas (10th season)
- Captain: Harold Newman
- Home stadium: Denny Stadium; Legion Field

1940 Southeastern Conference football standings
	Conf.					Overall
Team		W		L			W		L
No. 4 Tennessee $	5	–	0	–	0	10	–	1	–	0
No. 9 Mississippi State	4	–	0	–	1	10	–	0	–	1
Ole Miss	3	–	1	–	0	9	–	2	–	0
Alabama	4	–	2	–	0	7	–	2	–	0
Auburn	3	–	2	–	1	6	–	4	–	1
LSU	3	–	3	–	0	6	–	4	–	0
Georgia	2	–	3	–	1	5	–	4	–	1
Florida	2	–	3	–	0	5	–	5	–	0
Kentucky	1	–	2	–	2	5	–	3	–	2
Tulane	1	–	3	–	0	5	–	5	–	0
Vanderbilt	1	–	5	–	1	3	–	6	–	1
Georgia Tech	1	–	5	–	0	3	–	7	–	0
Sewanee	0	–	1	–	0	3	–	5	–	0
$ – Conference champion; Rankings from AP Poll

The 1940 Alabama Crimson Tide football team (variously "Alabama", "UA" or "Bama") represented the University of Alabama in the 1940 college football season. It was the Crimson Tide's 47th overall and 8th season as a member of the Southeastern Conference (SEC). The team was led by head coach Frank Thomas, in his tenth year, and played their home games at Denny Stadium in Tuscaloosa and Legion Field in Birmingham, Alabama. They finished the season with a record of seven wins and two losses (7–2 overall, 4–2 in the SEC).

The Crimson Tide opened the 1940 season with three consecutive, non-conference victories over Spring Hill, Mercer and Howard. However, Alabama was defeated 27–12 by Tennessee in their conference opener in week four. The Crimson Tide then rebounded with four consecutive conference victories over Kentucky, Tulane, Georgia Tech and Vanderbilt. Alabama then closed their season with a loss against Mississippi State on homecoming at Denny Stadium.

Alabama was ranked at No. 24 (out of 697 college football teams) in the final rankings under the Litkenhous Difference by Score system for 1940.

== Schedule ==
Date	Opponent	Rank	Site	Result	Attendance
September 27	at Spring Hill*		Murphy High School Stadium; Mobile, AL	W 26–0	7,500
October 5	Mercer*		Denny Stadium; Tuscaloosa, AL	W 20–0	6,000
October 12	Howard (AL)*		Denny Stadium; Tuscaloosa, AL	W 31–0	4,500
October 19	No. 5 Tennessee		Legion Field; Birmingham, AL (Third Saturday in October)	L 12–27	24,500
November 2	at Kentucky		McLean Stadium; Lexington, KY	W 25–0	13,000
November 9	Tulane		Legion Field; Birmingham, AL	W 13–6	20,000
November 16	at Georgia Tech	No. 14	Grant Field; Atlanta, GA (rivalry)	W 14–13	25,000
November 23	Vanderbilt	No. 17	Legion Field; Birmingham, AL	W 25–21	
November 30	No. 11 Mississippi State^{†}	No. 17	Denny Stadium; Tuscaloosa, AL (rivalry)	L 0–13	18,500
*Non-conference game; ^{†}Homecoming; Rankings from AP Poll released prior to the game

== Rankings ==
Ranking movements Legend: ██ Increase in ranking ██ Decrease in ranking — = Not ranked
	Week							
Poll	1	2	3	4	5	6	7	Final
AP	—	—	—	—	14	17	17	—

== Game summaries ==
=== Spring Hill ===
Team	1	2	3	4	Total
• Alabama	0	7	13	6	26
Spring Hill	0	0	0	0	0

- Date: September 27
- Location: Murphy H. S. Stadium
  Mobile, AL
- Game attendance: 7,500

To open the 1940 season, Alabama defeated Spring Hill College 26–0 at Murphy High School Stadium in Mobile. After a scoreless first quarter, the Crimson Tide scored their first touchdown on a one-yard Paul Spencer run in the second quarter and held a 7–0 halftime lead. In the third quarter, Alabama extended their lead to 20–0 with touchdowns scored runs of two-yards by Spencer and 31-yards by Dave Brown. They then closed the game with a five-yard Herschel Mosley touchdown run in the fourth quarter for the 26–0 victory. This contest is notable for being the first night game ever played by an Alabama football team.

=== Mercer ===
Team	1	2	3	4	Total
Mercer	0	0	0	0	0
• Alabama	6	7	7	0	20

- Date: October 5
- Location: Denny Stadium
  Tuscaloosa, AL
- Game attendance: 6,000

In their first home game of the season, Alabama shutout the Mercer Bears 20–0 on an unseasonably warm afternoon that saw temperatures in excess of 90 degrees. Paul Spencer scored both of the Crimson Tide's first half touchdowns on runs of six and five yards for a 13–0 halftime lead. The final score came in the third quarter on a six-yard Dave Brown touchdown run. In the victory, the Alabama defense only allowed the Bears one first down and held their offense to net yardage of minus 17.

=== Howard (AL) ===
Team	1	2	3	4	Total
Howard	0	0	0	0	0
• Alabama	6	7	12	6	31

- Date: October 12
- Location: Denny Stadium
  Tuscaloosa, AL
- Game attendance: 4,500

At Denny Stadium, Alabama defeated Howard (now Samford University) 31–0 for their third consecutive shutout to open the season. Paul Spencer scored first with his one-yard touchdown run in the first quarter followed by a six-yard Dave Brown touchdown run in the second quarter for a 13–0 halftime lead. After Spencer scored again in the third on a seven-yard run, Jimmy Nelson intercepted a Jimmy Tarrant pass and returned it 88-yards for a touchdown. Don Salls then scored the final points of the game in the fourth quarter on a ten-yard run for the 31–0 victory.

=== Tennessee ===
Third Saturday in October

Team	1	2	3	4	Total
• #5 Tennessee	0	14	0	13	27
Alabama	0	6	6	0	12

- Date: October 19
- Location: Legion Field
  Birmingham, AL
- Game attendance: 24,500

On the Monday prior to their annual game against the Volunteers, Tennessee was selected to the No. 5 position in the first AP Poll of the 1940 season. In the game, Alabama was defeated by rival Tennessee 27–12 before an overflow crowd of 24,500 at Legion Field. After a scoreless first quarter, Alabama took their only lead of the game early in the second quarter on a 14-yard fake reverse by Jimmy Nelson for a touchdown. The Volunteers responded with a pair of John Butler touchdowns to take a 14–6 halftime lead. The first came on an 11-yard Butler pass to Al Hurst and the second on a 19-yard Butler punt return.

Alabama then cut the lead to 14–12 in the third quarter after Dave Brown returned a Tennessee punt 57-yards for a touchdown. The Volunteers responded with a pair of fourth-quarter touchdowns to seal the victory. The first came on a five-yard Buss Warren pass to Mike Balitsaris and the second on a 24-yard Warren to Balitsaris pass.

=== Kentucky ===
Team	1	2	3	4	Total
• Alabama	0	13	6	6	25
Kentucky	0	0	0	0	0

- Date: November 2
- Location: McLean Stadium
  Lexington, KY
- Game attendance: 13,000

On what was homecoming for Kentucky, the Crimson Tide shutout the Wildcats 25–0 at Lexington. After a scoreless first, Alabama started their first scoring drive of the game after Joe Domnanovich recovered a Kentucky fumble to give the Crimson Tide possession at the Wildcats' ten-yard line. Dave Brown then scored on a one-yard run for a 7–0 lead. Jimmy Nelson scored later in the quarter on a 63-yard touchdown run to give Alabama a 13–0 halftime lead. The Crimson Tide then closed the game with a pair of second half touchdowns for the 25–0 victory. The first came on a 39-yard Nelson run in the third and on a 40-yard Don Salls interception return in the fourth.

=== Tulane ===
Team	1	2	3	4	Total
Tulane	0	0	0	6	6
• Alabama	0	6	7	0	13

- Date: November 11
- Location: Legion Field
  Birmingham, AL
- Game attendance: 20,000

In Birmingham, the Crimson Tide defeated the Green Wave 13–6 before a crowd of 20,000 at Legion Field. After a scoreless first, Alabama took a 6–0 halftime lead when Paul Spencer scored a touchdown on a short run after Holt Rast recovered a fumbled punt at the Tulane three-yard line. Early in the third quarter, Dave Brown extended the Alabama lead to 13–0 with his 12-yard touchdown run. Tulane did start a comeback in the fourth quarter with a touchdown, but was stopped late in the game when Ed Hickerson intercepted a Harry Hays pass at the Alabama eight-yard line to seal the Crimson Tide win.

=== Georgia Tech ===
Team	1	2	3	4	Total
• #14 Alabama	0	7	7	0	14
Georgia Tech	0	6	7	0	13

- Date: November 16
- Location: Grant Field
  Atlanta, GA
- Game attendance: 25,000

Prior to their final road game of the season against Georgia Tech, Alabama entered the AP Poll for the first time of the season at No. 14. Against the Yellow Jackets, the Crimson Tide won on a missed extra point 14–13 at Grant Field. Tech scored first on a nine-yard J. W. Bosch touchdown pass to R. L. Ison; however, C. P. Goree missed the extra point that would later prove to be the final margin of loss. Alabama responded on the kickoff that ensued when Jimmy Nelson scored on a 94-yard touchdown return. Each team then traded third-quarter touchdowns. Alabama scored first on a short Paul Spencer run followed by a C. R. Bates touchdown pass to G. I. Webb.

=== Vanderbilt ===
Team	1	2	3	4	Total
Vanderbilt	7	7	0	7	21
• #17 Alabama	0	0	13	12	25

- Date: November 23
- Location: Legion Field
  Birmingham, AL

As a result of their unexpectedly close contest against Georgia Tech, Alabama dropped three spots to the No. 17 position in the AP Poll prior to their game against Vanderbilt. In their game against the Commodores, Alabama rallied from a 14–0 deficit to defeat Vanderbilt 25–21 in the final Legion Field game of the 1940 season. The Commodores took a 14–0 halftime lead with touchdowns scored in the first on a 39-yard Charlton Davis pass to Binks Bushmiaer and in the second on a six-yard George Marlin run. Alabama responded in the third quarter with a pair of touchdowns to cut the lead to 14–13. Touchdowns were scored on a 12-yard Jimmy Nelson pass to Hal Newman and on a short Dave Brown run. In the fourth, Vanderbilt extended their lead to 21–13 with an Art Rebrovich touchdown run, but ten gave up a pair of late touchdowns to give Alabama the 25–21 win. Alabama's final touchdowns were scored on a pair of Nelson passes, first to Holt Rast and the second to Russ Craft for the win.

=== Mississippi State ===
Team	1	2	3	4	Total
• # 11 Mississippi State	7	0	0	6	13
#17 Alabama	0	0	0	0	0

- Date: November 30
- Location: Denny Stadium
  Tuscaloosa, AL
- Game attendance: 18,500

In the final game of the season, Alabama was shutout 13–0 against the Mississippi State Maroons on homecoming at Denny Stadium. The Maroons scored both of their touchdowns on runs of nine-yards by Harvey Johnson in the first quarter and 23-yards by Charles Yancey in the fourth quarter.

== After the season ==
=== NFL draft ===
Several players that were varsity lettermen from the 1940 squad were drafted into the National Football League (NFL) between the 1941 and 1943 drafts. These players included the following:

Year	Round	Overall	Player name	Position	NFL team
1941	3	25	Fred Davis	Tackle	Washington Redskins
1941	7	58	Hal Newman	End	Brooklyn Dodgers
1941	10	90	Ed Hickerson	Guard	Washington Redskins
1942	9	79	Noah Langdale	Tackle	Green Bay Packers
1942	14	123	John Wyhonic	Guard	Philadelphia Eagles
1942	18	170	Holt Rast	End	Chicago Bears
1942	19	174	Jimmy Nelson	Back	Chicago Cardinals
1943	4	28	Joe Domnanovich	Center	Brooklyn Dodgers
1943	5	33	George Hecht	Guard	Chicago Cardinals
1943	14	122	George Weeks	End	Philadelphia Eagles
1943	14	125	Sam Sharpe	End	Cleveland Rams
1943	15	132	Russ Craft	Back	Philadelphia Eagles
1943	25	236	Dave Brown	Back	New York Giants
1943	29	274	Al Sabo	Back	Brooklyn Dodgers

== Personnel ==
=== Varsity letter winners ===
Player	Hometown	Position
Warren Averitte	Greenville, Mississippi	Center
Dave Brown	Birmingham, Alabama	Halfback
Russ Craft	Beach Bottom, West Virginia	Halfback
Fred Davis	Louisville, Kentucky	Tackle
Chuck DeShane	Grand Rapids, Michigan	Quarterback
Joe Domnanovich	South Bend, Indiana	Center
Elwood Gerber	Naperville, Illinois	Guard
Cliff Hansen	Gary, Indiana	Tackle
John Hanson	Roanoke, Alabama	Fullback
Billy Harrell	Opelika, Alabama	Halfback
George Hecht	Chicago Heights, Illinois	Guard
Ed Hickerson	Ventura, California	Guard
Noah Langdale	Valdosta, Georgia	Tackle
Jimmy Nelson	Live Oak, Florida	Halfback
Hal Newman	Birmingham, Alabama	End
Holt Rast	Birmingham, Alabama	End
James Roberts	Blytheville, Arkansas	End
Al Sabo	Los Angeles, California	Quarterback
Don Salls	White Plains, New York	Fullback
Sam Sharpe	Birmingham, Alabama	End
Paul Spencer	Hampton, Virginia	Fullback
George Weeks	Dothan, Alabama	End
John Wyhonic	Connorville, Ohio	Guard

=== Coaching staff ===
Name	Position	Seasons at Alabama	Alma mater
Frank Thomas	Head coach	10	Notre Dame (1923)
Paul Burnum	Assistant coach	11	Alabama (1922)
Tilden Campbell	Assistant coach	5	Alabama (1935)
Hank Crisp	Assistant coach	20	VPI (1920)
Harold Drew	Assistant coach	10	Bates (1916)
