= 1940 Tennessee Volunteers football team =

American college football season

1940 Tennessee Volunteers football

National champion (Dunkel) SEC champion

Sugar Bowl, L 13–19 vs. Boston College
- Conference: Southeastern Conference

Ranking
- AP: No. 4
- Record: 10–1 (5–0 SEC)
- Head coach: Robert Neyland (14th season)
- Offensive scheme: Single-wing
- Home stadium: Shields–Watkins Field

1940 Southeastern Conference football standings
	Conf.					Overall
Team		W		L			W		L
No. 4 Tennessee $	5	–	0	–	0	10	–	1	–	0
No. 9 Mississippi State	4	–	0	–	1	10	–	0	–	1
Ole Miss	3	–	1	–	0	9	–	2	–	0
Alabama	4	–	2	–	0	7	–	2	–	0
Auburn	3	–	2	–	1	6	–	4	–	1
LSU	3	–	3	–	0	6	–	4	–	0
Georgia	2	–	3	–	1	5	–	4	–	1
Florida	2	–	3	–	0	5	–	5	–	0
Kentucky	1	–	2	–	2	5	–	3	–	2
Tulane	1	–	3	–	0	5	–	5	–	0
Vanderbilt	1	–	5	–	1	3	–	6	–	1
Georgia Tech	1	–	5	–	0	3	–	7	–	0
Sewanee	0	–	1	–	0	3	–	5	–	0
$ – Conference champion; Rankings from AP Poll

The 1940 Tennessee Volunteers represented the University of Tennessee in the 1940 college football season. Playing as a member of the Southeastern Conference (SEC), the team was led by head coach Robert Neyland, in his 14th year, and played their home games at Shields–Watkins Field in Knoxville, Tennessee. They finished the season with a record of ten wins and one loss (10–1 overall, 5–0 in the SEC), as SEC champions and with a loss against Boston College in the 1941 Sugar Bowl.

This team claims a national championship after being recognized under the Dunkel System, a power index system devised by Dick Dunkel Sr.

== Schedule ==
Date	Opponent	Rank	Site	Result	Attendance	Source
September 28	Mercer*		Shields–Watkins Field; Knoxville, TN	W 49–0	20,000	
October 5	Duke*		Shields–Watkins Field; Knoxville, TN	W 13–0	25,000	
October 12	Chattanooga*		Shields–Watkins Field; Knoxville, TN	W 53–0	12,000	
October 19	at Alabama	No. 5	Legion Field; Birmingham, AL (Third Saturday in October)	W 27–12	24,500	
October 26	Florida	No. 5	Shields–Watkins Field; Knoxville, TN (rivalry)	W 14–0	15,000	
November 2	LSU^{†}	No. 7	Shields–Watkins Field; Knoxville, TN	W 28–0	18,000	
November 9	at Southwestern (TN)*	No. 5	Crump Stadium; Memphis, TN	W 40–0	8,000	
November 16	Virginia*	No. 5	Shields–Watkins Field; Knoxville, TN	W 41–14	7,000	
November 23	Kentucky	No. 6	Shields–Watkins Field; Knoxville, TN (rivalry)	W 33–0	25,000	
November 30	at Vanderbilt	No. 6	Dudley Field; Nashville, TN (rivalry)	W 20–0	25,000	
January 1, 1941	vs. No. 5 Boston College*	No. 4	Tulane Stadium; New Orleans, LA (Sugar Bowl)	L 13–19	73,181	
*Non-conference game; ^{†}Homecoming; Rankings from AP Poll released prior to the game

== Rankings ==
Ranking movements Legend: ██ Increase in ranking ██ Decrease in ranking ( ) = First-place votes
	Week							
Poll	1	2	3	4	5	6	7	Final
AP	5 (7)	5 (6)	7	5 (11)	5 (2)	6 (3)	6 (8)	4 (10)
