= Tom Lieb =

American discus thrower and football player (1899–1962)

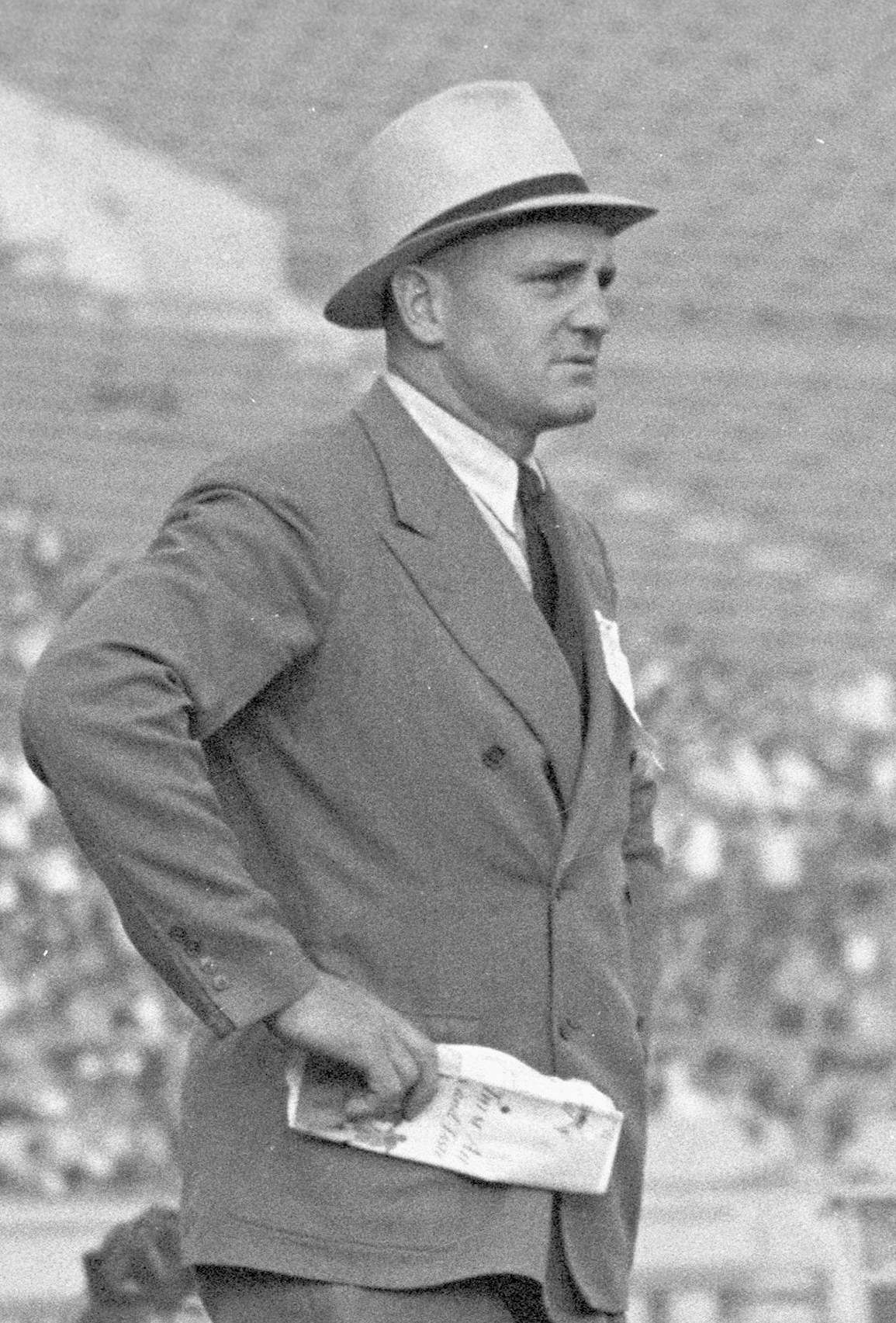
- Lieb as the coach of Loyola, 1937

Biographical details
- Born: October 28, 1899; Faribault, Minnesota, U.S.
- Died: April 30, 1962 (aged 62); Los Angeles, California, U.S.

Playing career

Football
- 1919–1922: Notre Dame

Ice hockey
- 1922–1923: Notre Dame
- Positions: Tackle (football); Goaltender (ice hockey)

Coaching career (HC unless noted)

Football
- 1923–1925: Notre Dame (assistant)
- 1926–1928: Wisconsin (line)
- 1929: Notre Dame (assistant)
- 1930–1938: Loyola (CA)
- 1940–1945: Florida
- 1946–1950: Alabama (line)

Ice hockey
- 1923–1926: Notre Dame

Track and Field
- 1946–1951: Alabama

Administrative career (AD unless noted)
- 1940–1945: Florida

Head coaching record
- Overall: 67–59–5 (football)

Sports career
- Height: 190 cm (6 ft 3 in)
- Weight: 98 kg (216 lb)
- Sport: Athletics
- Event: Discus throw
- Club: Illinois Athletic Club

Sports achievements and titles
- Personal best: 47.61 (1924)
Medal record
Men's athletics
Representing the United States
Olympic Games
Bronze medal – third place	1924 Paris	Discus throw

Thomas John Lieb (October 28, 1899 – April 30, 1962) was an American Olympic track and field athlete, an All-American college football player and a multi-sport collegiate coach. Lieb was a Minnesota native and an alumnus of the University of Notre Dame, where he played college football. He was best known as the head coach of the Loyola Marymount University and University of Florida football teams.

== College sports career ==
Tom Lieb was born in Faribault, Minnesota in 1899. In high school, Lieb excelled at baseball, football, ice hockey, and track and field. He attended the University of Notre Dame in South Bend, Indiana, where he lettered in all four sports and twice received All-American football honors. During the 1922 season, Lieb broke his leg in the game against Purdue. While doing his graduate studies at the university, he coached the Notre Dame hockey and track & field teams, and also coached the linemen for the Fighting Irish football team under head coach Knute Rockne.

Lieb was a two-time National Collegiate Athletic Association (NCAA) national collegiate champion in the discus in 1922 and 1923, and the Amateur Athletic Union (AAU) national open champion in 1923 and 1924. He is widely credited with introducing the modern spin delivery that is still used today. At the 1924 Summer Olympics held in Paris, France, Lieb competed for the United States in the discus throw and won the bronze medal, but did not equal the distance of his qualifying throw. Several weeks after the Olympics ended, Lieb broke the discus world record with a throw of 47.61 meters (156 feet 2½ inches).

== Coaching career ==
Following his graduation, Lieb accepted an offer to coach the linemen for the Wisconsin Badgers. In 1929, Lieb returned to Notre Dame as the assistant football coach, and was instrumental in directing the Irish to a national championship as Knute Rockne spent most of the season recovering from complications due to thrombophlebitis, a crippling infection of Rockne's leg.

Lieb's coaching success was recognized when he was offered the head coaching position at Loyola University in Los Angeles, California, where he remained from 1930 to 1938. Lieb relished his role as the Loyola Lions head football coach, posing with lion cubs in publicity photographs, and posted an overall record of 47–33–4. Lieb also started Loyola's ice hockey program as an off-season conditioning program for his football players, but quickly built the team into a powerhouse with an annual rivalry with the University of Southern California. From 1935 to 1938, Lieb's hockey Lions won four consecutive Pacific Coast Intercollegiate League titles and compiled a 38–3–2 record. Lieb quit his coaching job at Loyola during his wife's illness in 1939, and then decided to leave California after she died.

In 1940, Lieb succeeded Josh Cody as the head football coach at the University of Florida in Gainesville, Florida, with high expectations based on his prior successes with Notre Dame and Loyola. He also served as Florida's athletic director. Lieb, however, was unable to duplicate the same level of success with the Gators that he had at Notre Dame and Loyola. In his five seasons of coaching the Florida Gators football team from 1940 to 1945, Lieb compiled a 20–26–1 record, and his contract was not renewed after the 1945 season. Thereafter, Lieb worked as the assistant Crimson Tide football coach and head track & field coach at the University of Alabama, where his old Notre Dame teammate Frank Thomas was the head football coach, from 1946 to 1951.

== Life after football ==
When Lieb retired in 1951, he returned to Los Angeles, where he became a public speaker. He died of an apparent heart attack in 1962 at age 62. He was elected to the Loyola Marymount Hall of Fame posthumously in 1987.

== Head coaching record ==
=== Football ===
Year	Team	Overall	Conference	Standing	Bowl/playoffs
Loyola Lions (Independent) (1930–1938)
1930	Loyola	2–3–1			
1931	Loyola	7–2–1			
1932	Loyola	4–4			
1933	Loyola	7–2–1			
1934	Loyola	7–2–1			
1935	Loyola	6–5			
1936	Loyola	6–3			
1937	Loyola	4–7			
1938	Loyola	4–5			
Loyola:		47–33–4			
Florida Gators (Southeastern Conference) (1940–1946)
1940	Florida	5–5	2–3	8th	
1941	Florida	4–6	1–3	10th	
1942	Florida	3–7	1–3	9th	
1943	No team—World War II				
1944	Florida	4–3	0–3	10th	
1945	Florida	4–5–1	1–3–1	T–10th	
Florida:		20–26–1	5–15–1		
Total:		67–59–5			

=== Ice hockey ===
Record table
Season	Team	Overall	Conference	Standing	Postseason
Notre Dame Fighting Irish Independent (1923–1926)
1923–24	Notre Dame	0–5–0			
1924–25	Notre Dame	0–2–2			
1925–26	Notre Dame	3–2–1			
Notre Dame:		3–9–3			
Total:		3–9–3			

== See also ==
- List of Olympic medalists in athletics (men)
- List of University of Notre Dame alumni
- List of University of Notre Dame athletes

Records
Preceded by James Duncan	Men's discus world record-holder September 14, 1924 – May 2, 1925	Succeeded by Glenn Hartranft
