= John Eibner (American football) =

American football player (1914–1973)

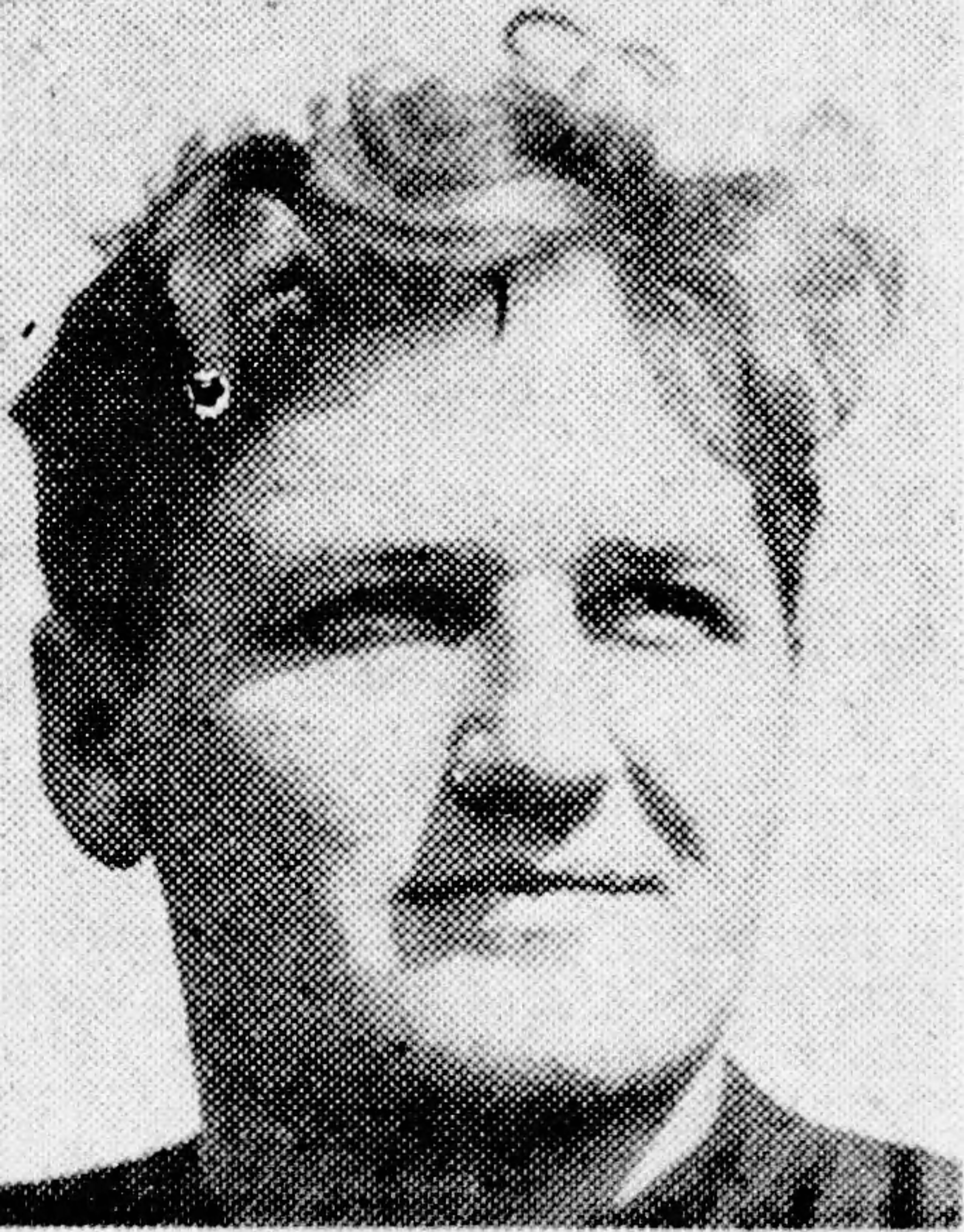
- Eibner, c. 1940

No. 76, 77
- Position: Tackle

Personal information
- Born: March 13, 1914; Elyria, Ohio, U.S.
- Died: November 23, 1973 (aged 59); Alachua County, Florida, U.S.
- Listed height: 6 ft 2 in (1.88 m)
- Listed weight: 228 lb (103 kg)

Career information
- High school: Jeannette (PA)
- College: Kentucky
- NFL draft: 1941: 15th round, 133rd overall pick

Career history
- Philadelphia Eagles (1941–1942, 1946)

Career NFL statistics
- Games played: 30
- Games started: 16
- Stats at Pro Football Reference

John Robert Eibner (March 13, 1914 – November 23, 1973) was an American professional football tackle.

Eibner was born in 1914 in Elyria, Ohio. He attended Jeannette High School in Jeannette, Pennsylvania.

He attended the University of Kentucky where he played for the 1938, 1939, and 1940 Kentucky Wildcats football teams. He was elected captain of the 1940 team.

He then played professional football in the National Football League (NFL) for the Philadelphia Eagles (NFL) in 1941, 1942, and 1946. He appeared in 30 NFL games, 16 as a starter.

His NFL career was interrupted by military service during World War II. He later worked for many years for the University of Florida, including roles as an assistant football coach and fundraiser. He died in 1973 at age 59.
