= Florida–Tennessee football rivalry =

American college football rivalry

- Florida Gators Tennessee Volunteers
- First meeting: October 28, 1916; Tennessee, 24–0
- Latest meeting: November 22, 2025; Tennessee, 31–11
- Next meeting: 2027 (Knoxville)

Statistics
- Total meetings: 55
- All-time series: Florida leads, 32–23
- Largest victory: Tennessee, 45–3 (1990)
- Longest win streak: Florida, 11 (2005–2015)
- Current win streak: Tennessee, 2 (2024–present)

Locations of the universities

The Florida–Tennessee football rivalry is an American college football rivalry between the Florida Gators football team of the University of Florida and Tennessee Volunteers football team of the University of Tennessee, who first met on the football field in 1916. The Gators and Vols have competed in the same athletic conference since Florida joined the now-defunct Southern Intercollegiate Athletic Association in 1910, and the schools were founding members of the Southeastern Conference in 1932. Despite this long conference association, a true rivalry did not develop until the early 1990s due to the infrequency of earlier meetings; in the first seventy-six years (1916–91) of the series, the two teams met just twenty-one times.

The Southeastern Conference (SEC) expanded to twelve universities and split into two divisions in 1992, and Florida and Tennessee were placed in the SEC's East Division and began to meet annually on a home-and-home basis. The matchups were often early in the season, giving rise to the Third Saturday in September nickname. The rivalry quickly blossomed in intensity and importance over the 1990s and early 2000s as both programs regularly fielded national championship contending teams under coaches Phil Fulmer of Tennessee and Steve Spurrier of Florida. The rivalry will be played every other season beginning in 2025 due to further SEC expansion and the league's move to a nine-game conference schedule.

Tennessee dominated the rivalry's early years, winning the first ten meetings and holding a 13–2 lead in the series after beating the Gators in 1971. Florida has held the advantage since then, especially since the schools became SEC East rivals in 1992. After Tennessee's 31–11 victory in 2025, the Gators lead the all-time series 32–23.

== Schedule ==
Florida and Tennessee's football teams first met in 1916, when both schools were members of the Southern Intercollegiate Athletic Association. They each joined the Southern Conference in the 1920s, and were founding members of the Southeastern Conference (SEC) in 1932. Despite these common affiliations, a true rivalry did not develop between the programs for a long time because they played so sparingly.

For many years, the SEC allowed schools to arrange their own conference schedules, which sometimes resulted in unusual or imbalanced conference slates that varied according to traditional opponents and each athletic department's travel budget. The University of Tennessee is located in Knoxville and the University of Florida is in Gainesville, which are approximately 550 miles (890 km) apart. Between the cost and time required to travel by train and the SEC's lax scheduling oversight, the two schools met on the gridiron only thirteen times between 1916 and 1969. Seven of these games were played in Knoxville, two in Gainesville, and four in other locations across Florida.

The SEC became a 10-member league in the late-1960s, and a new scheduling system had the Gators and Vols play seven times over the next 21 seasons. The SEC became a 12-member league in 1992 and split into two divisions. Both Florida and Tennessee were placed in the SEC's Eastern Division, and the rivals met every year from 1990 until 2025.

The SEC expanded to 16 members in 2024, and after two seasons of transition, members schools decided to move to a nine-game conference slate in 2026, disrupting several annual rivalries. Under the new scheduling formula, Florida and Tennessee will play every other year beginning in 2027, making 2026 the first college football season without a scheduled clash between the Gators and the Volunteers in 36 years.

=== Third Saturday in September ===
Florida and Tennessee played on the third Saturday of September almost every year from 1992 until the SEC expanded again in 2024, giving the rivalry its nickname. In many of those seasons, it was the first significant challenge of the season for one or both teams, with the winner gaining a key advantage in the race for a berth in the SEC Championship Game. Notable exceptions to the usual scheduling came in 2001, when the game was postponed until December 1 due to the September 11 attacks, and in 2020, when the COVID-19 pandemic delayed the start of the season and shifted the Florida–Tennessee game to December 5.

=== Other sports ===
As long-time members of the same conference, Tennessee and Florida have long competed in many other sports besides football. Men's basketball in particular became a heated rivalry for a time in the mid- to late-2000s, when coach Bruce Pearl's Volunteer squads challenged coach Billy Donovan's national championship-winning Gator teams for supremacy in the SEC's Eastern Division. However, the basketball rivalry cooled after Pearl was fired in 2011 and Donovan left Florida for the NBA in 2015. In general, it has been the schools' football rivalry which has consistently received more attention from fans and media over the years.

== Series history ==
=== Early history ===
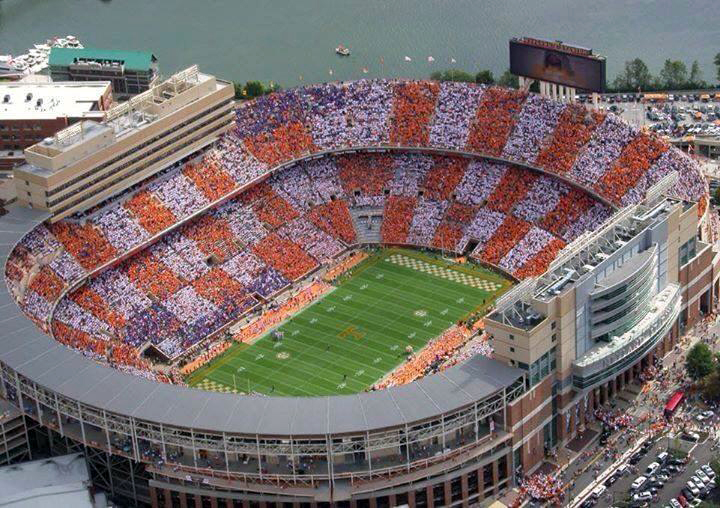
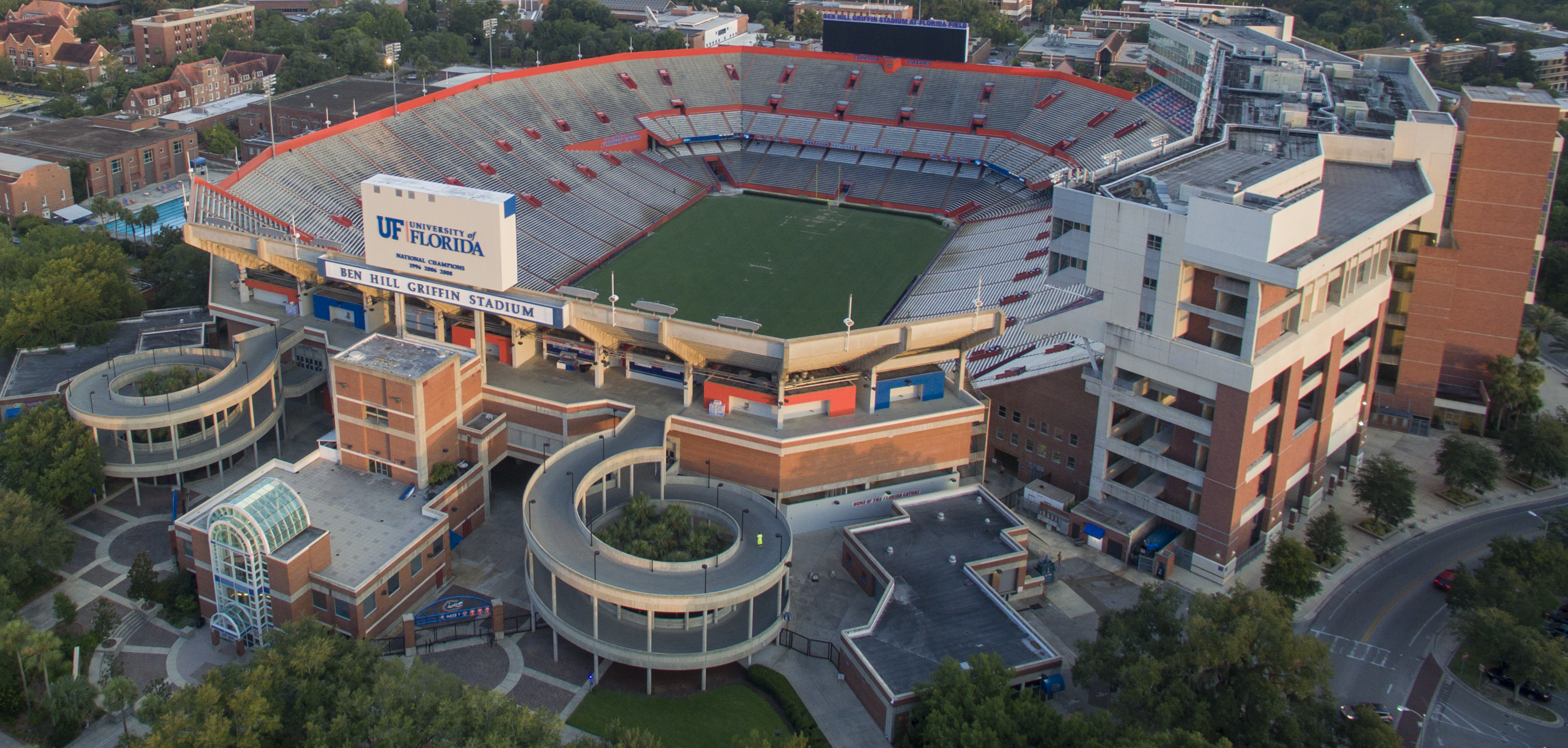
Starting in 1954, the rivalry alternates between Tennessee's and Florida's home stadiums each year: Neyland Stadium in Knoxville, Tennessee, and Ben Hill Griffin Stadium in Gainesville, Florida, respectively.

Tennessee dominated the early series, winning their first 10 meetings with Florida over a span of 37 years (1916–53). The highlight of this period was a 1928 season-ending matchup between undefeated squads in Knoxville that the Volunteers won 13–12. Florida finally beat Tennessee in 1954, winning 14–0 in Knoxville, but Tennessee won the return visit to Gainesville the following year, which was the first time that the teams played at Florida Field.

Florida and Tennessee would not meet again for fourteen years, the longest gap in the series. They next faced off in the 1969 Gator Bowl. In that highly unusual post-season matchup between conference foes, Florida won 14–13, then hired away the Tennessee's head coach, former Gator quarterback Doug Dickey.

At the conclusion of the 1960s, Tennessee owned an 11–2 all-time record against Florida.

=== 1970s and 1980s ===
Tennessee won their first two clashes against Dickey's Gators, and Florida won the next two, including a 1976 victory in Gainesville that was their first home win against the Vols in four tries. Dickey resigned as Florida's coach after the 1978 season, ending a largely disappointing tenure at Florida and eventually returning to Knoxville in 1985 to become Tennessee's athletic director.

Florida ran their win streak over Tennessee to four games (over nine seasons) with wins in Knoxville and Gainesville in 1984 and 1985 as they topped the SEC standings in both years. However, Florida would not be officially recognized for those championships, as the program was put on NCAA probation during the 1984 season due to violations committed under former coach Charley Pell. Though SEC's executive committee had initially ruled that Florida could keep their first ever conference championship, the university presidents later overturned the decision and vacated the title. Florida President Marshall Criser and the university community were incensed by this reversal, and many blamed the University of Tennessee for leading the movement to strip UF's first conference championship.

On the field, Florida held a 4–2 advantage during the 1970s and 80s.

=== 1990s ===
Tennessee and Florida rotated back onto each other's schedule in 1990, which was coincidentally the same year that former Florida quarterback Steve Spurrier returned to Gainesville as the Gators' new head coach. Spurrier had spent most of his youth in Tennessee, and his return to the state was marred by a 45–3 Vols rout in 1990, the largest margin of victory in series history. Florida won the return game in Gainesville in 1991 on their way to their first official conference championship.

==== SEC East rivals ====
One result of the SEC's 1992 expansion and split into divisions was the beginning of an annual match-up between Florida and Tennessee at a time when both programs rose to national prominence. As a result, Florida and Tennessee have met on a home-and-home basis every year since 1990.

Under head coaches Steve Spurrier and Phillip Fulmer, the Gators and Volunteers were annual contenders for conference and national championships, with both teams usually fielding wide-open offenses led by top quarterbacks such as Danny Wuerffel and Peyton Manning, among many other highly decorated players on both sides of the ball.

Their first match-up as permanent opponents in 1992 helped to sow the seeds of rivalry, as the underdog Vols beat the defending SEC champion Gators in Neyland Stadium. Fulmer had been serving as UT's interim head coach while Johnny Majors recovered from heart problems, but his team's upset of the Gators helped to secure him the permanent position and brought about a decade of games in which the rivalry was one of the key match-ups of every college football season. The Gators turned the tables and upset the Volunteers in 1993, with true freshman Wuerffel outplaying Heisman Trophy candidate Heath Shuler in a 41–34 win that was Fulmer's first loss as Tennessee's head coach.

The rivalry held national championship implications over each of the following seasons, with both teams entering the contests ranked in the top 10 every year. Though they were not always the favorite, Florida won five straight against Tennessee from 1993 to 1997, winning four SEC titles and a consensus national championship in 1996. The 1994, 1995, and 1996 contests featured match-ups between starting quarterbacks Danny Wuerffel and Peyton Manning, who never beat Florida during his celebrated college career. But though Florida beat Tennessee in 1997, upset losses to LSU and Georgia propelled Tennessee to their own SEC championship in Manning's senior year. Tennessee broke Florida's winning streak in 1998 with a 20–17 overtime win and went on to win their second straight SEC championship and a national championship. In 1999, Florida upset the Vols in Gainesville to close out the decade.

During the 1990s, Florida and Tennessee combined to win eight conference and two national championships, and either the Gators or the Volunteers represented the SEC East in each of the first ten SEC Championship games. Both teams were ranked in the top 10 for eight out of their ten contests during the decade, and neither team ever entered their rivalry game ranked lower than No. 15. Florida held a 7–3 record against Tennessee from 1990 to 1999.

=== 2000s ===
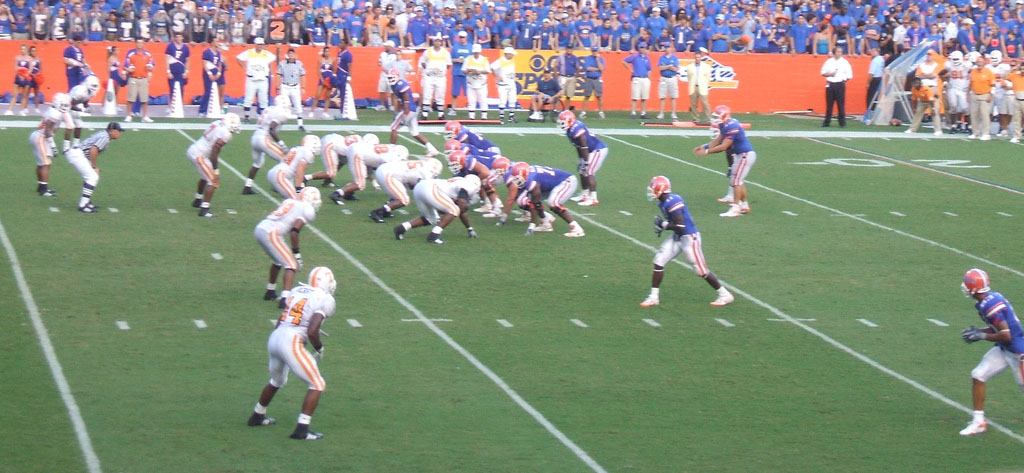
2007 game

Florida began the next decade with a 27–23 victory in Knoxville in front of a national record crowd of 108,768 fans. During the following season, the September 11 attacks postponed all NCAA Division-I football games that were scheduled to be played on the following Saturday. The Florida and Tennessee match-up was rescheduled for December, and the Vols upset the Gators in Gainesville, winning on Florida Field for the first time since 1971. Steve Spurrier left Florida for the NFL after the 2001 season, but two trends in the rivalry continued in 2002: both teams were ranked in the top 10, and new Florida coach Ron Zook led the Gators to another win in Knoxville. However, both teams stumbled later in the season, and for the first time ever, neither would represent the SEC's Eastern Conference in the SEC Championship Game. The 2002 contest would be the last time to date in which both schools would enter their annual clash ranked in the top 10.

For the first time since the division rivalry began 11 years earlier, the 2003 match-up featured UF and UT teams that were each ranked out of the top 10 (UT No. 12, UF No. 17), and the game was relegated to a noon kickoff on CBS. Tennessee pulled away in the second half to win 24–10 for their second victory in Gainesville. The Vols were victorious against Florida again in 2004 for their 2nd straight win against Florida and their third victory in four meetings.

Ron Zook was fired during the 2004 season, and new Gator coach Urban Meyer put an emphasis on defending their home turf. Florida's 16–7 home win over Tennessee in 2005 helped to revive the program and started a Gator win streak in the rivalry that would span over a decade. Meyer's Gators beat Fulmer's Volunteers again in 2006 and 2007, and while Florida was SEC and national champions in 2006, Tennessee reached the SEC championship game in 2007. Florida won 30–6 in Knoxville in 2008 on their way to another SEC and national championship season. After Tennessee recorded its second losing season within a four-year span, Fulmer resigned as the Vols' head coach.

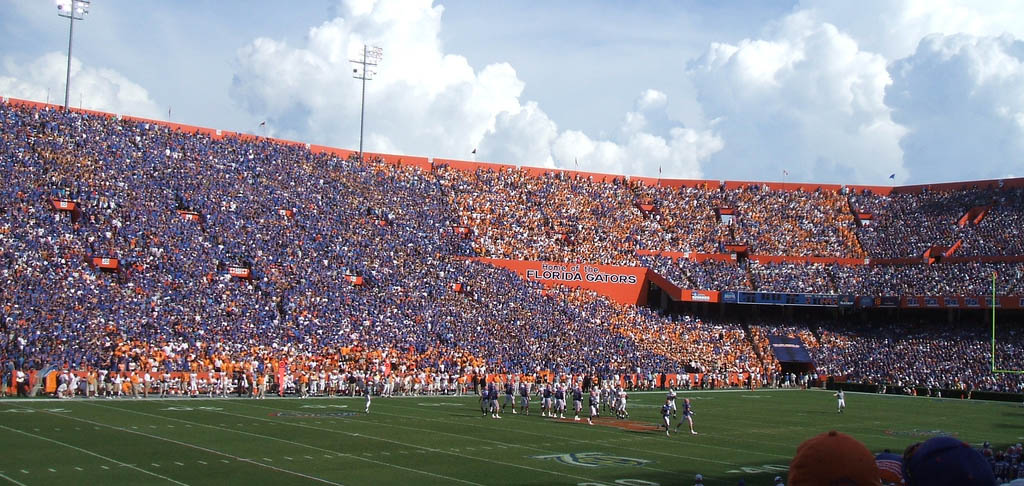
Gator fans are encouraged to wear blue when Florida plays Tennessee to stand out from orange-clad Volunteer fans.

Lane Kiffin replaced Fulmer as Tennessee's coach in 2009. He verbally sparred with Gators coach Urban Meyer in the months leading up to their first meeting, but the Gators beat the Volunteers in Gainesville in 2009, and Kiffin left Tennessee after the season.

From 2000 to 2009, Florida again held a 7–3 advantage over Tennessee.

=== 2010s ===
Urban Meyer left Florida after the 2010 season, and while the program suffered through sub-par seasons under coach Will Muschamp (who was the Gators' coach from 2011 to 2014) their win streak over Tennessee continued during the first half of the decade. The Volunteers simultaneously suffered through some sub-par seasons of their own under coaches Derek Dooley (Tennessee's coach from 2010 to 2012) and Butch Jones (who arrived in 2013). The Gators ran their series win streak to eleven with a 28–27 comeback win in Gainesville in 2015, the first year under newly appointed head coach Jim McElwain. The 2016 and 2017 would also feature second half comebacks. Tennessee came back from a 21–0 first half deficit in 2016 to beat the Gators and end Florida's series-long winning streak at 11 games, and Florida won in 2017 with a Hail Mary pass on the last play of the game.

While the rivalry was still important to both schools, it lacked its previous national impact and attention during the first half of the decade. In 2013, both Tennessee and Florida failed to qualify for a bowl game during the same season for the first time since 1978. In 2014 and 2015, both teams came into their game unranked, something that had not happened since the 1950s.

Both programs showed glimmers of improvement in the middle of the decade under coaches McElwain and Jones. Florida made back to the SEC Championship Game in 2015 and 2016, and both Florida and Tennessee were ranked in the AP top 25 coming into their 2016 and 2017 meetings. However, both the Gators and Vols faded to losing records in 2017, and both programs dismissed their once-promising head coaches before the end of the season. New coaches Dan Mullen of Florida and Jeremy Pruitt of Tennessee met in 2018 and 2019, both Gator victories.

Florida amassed a 9–1 record against Tennessee during the 2010s.

=== 2020s ===
Both programs changed coaches again early in the decade, with Josh Heupel taking over at UT in 2021 and Billy Napier at UF in 2022. Florida's series win streak grew to five before Tennessee won in Knoxville in 2022 in what marked the first time in six years that both teams came into their rivalry game ranked in the AP top 20. Florida upset the #11 Volunteers in 2023 to extend their home winning streak in the series to ten games. In 2025, Tennessee captured their first win in Gainesville since 2003.

=== Coaching connections ===
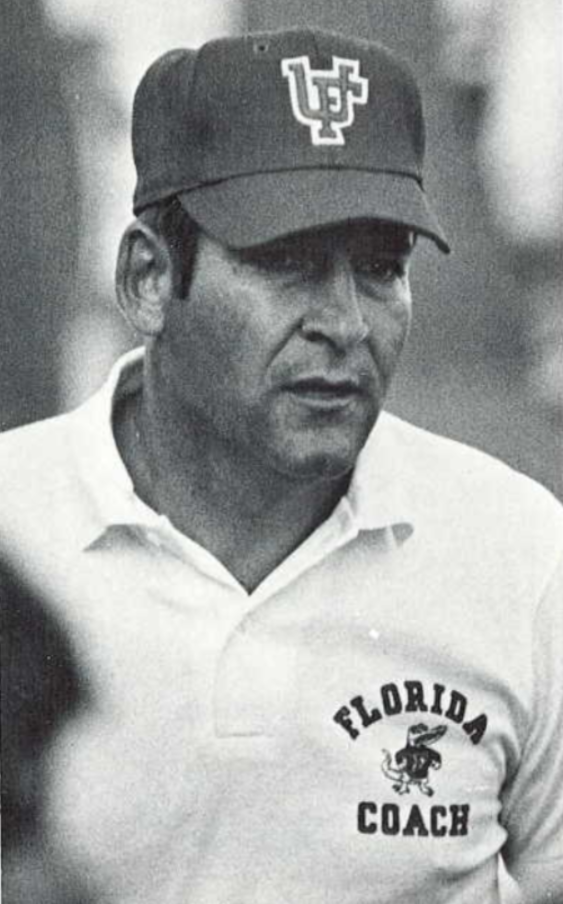
Doug Dickey was Florida's starting quarterback, then Tennessee's head coach, then Florida's head coach, and finally Tennessee's athletic director

Though it is common for college coaches to switch allegiances as their careers progress, Tennessee and Florida's football programs have had a remarkably complicated web of personnel connections over the years, mostly centering around Doug Dickey. Dickey was raised in Gainesville, where his father was a professor at UF, and he walked on to Florida's football team under head coach and athletic director Bob Woodruff, who had played football at Tennessee under coach Robert Neyland. Though Dickey began his college career as a reserve defensive back, he was named the Gators' starting quarterback before his senior season of 1953 and led the team to their first bowl victory.

In 1960, Woodruff was replaced as Florida's football coach and athletic director by fellow UT alumnus Ray Graves. Graves was born and raised in Knoxville and was a captain on Tennessee's 1940 team under Coach Neyland. A few years into his tenure at UF, Graves recruited Florida-born and Tennessee-raised quarterback Steve Spurrier to Gainesville, where he would become Florida's first Heisman Trophy winner in 1966.

Woodruff returned to Tennessee after leaving Florida and became UT's athletic director in 1963 following the death of Neyland. One of his first major decisions was to hire his former player Doug Dickey as Tennessee's head football coach. Dickey enjoyed several years of success at Tennessee, leading the Vols to two SEC championships and five straight bowl appearances. He controversially returned to Gainesville after accepting an offer to become Florida's head coach only days after the Gators and Volunteers met in the 1969 Gator Bowl. Dickey replaced Ray Graves, who had unexpectedly retired from coaching after the 1969 season to become UF's full-time athletic director and was instrumental in choosing Dickey as his successor. In 1978, Doug Dickey gave Steve Spurrier his first opportunity to coach when he hired the former star player as an offensive assistant. However, Dickey was unable to maintain the same level of success at Florida as he had at Tennessee, and Graves fired him after the 1978 season.

In 1985, Dickey returned to Knoxville to become UT's athletic director, replacing the retiring Bob Woodruff. Dickey named Phil Fulmer as Tennessee's head coach in 1992, setting up the intense Spurrier/Fulmer rivalry of the 1990s. Dickey retired in 2002, after which he returned to Florida to live near family in Jacksonville.

| Name | Raised | Playing career | Coaching career | Athletic Director | Notes |
|---|---|---|---|---|---|
| Bob Woodruff | Athens, GA | Tennessee (1936–1938) | UF (1950–1959); UT (asst.) (1939–1942, 1961–1962) | UF (1950–1959); UT (1963–1985) | Starter at Tennessee under Robert Neyland; Doug Dickey's head coach at Florida, Hired Dickey as Tennessee's HC |
| Ray Graves | Knoxville, TN | Tennessee (1940–1941) | UT (asst.) (1944–45); UF (1960–1969) | UF (1960–1979) | Team captain at Tennessee under Robert Neyland, Recruited Steve Spurrier to Florida, Hired and fired Doug Dickey as Florida's HC |
| Doug Dickey | Gainesville, FL | Florida (1951–1953) | UT (1964–1969); UF (1970–1979) | UT (1985–2002) | QB at Florida under Bob Woodruff, Originator of UT's "Power T" helmets and checkerboard endzones, Hired Steve Spurrier as UF assistant, Hired Phil Fulmer as Tennessee's HC |

== Game results ==
| Florida victories | Tennessee victories |

| No. | Date | Location | Winning team | | Losing team | |
|---|---|---|---|---|---|---|
| 1 | October 28, 1916 | Tampa, FL | Tennessee | 24 | Florida | 0 |
| 2 | October 22, 1921 | Knoxville, TN | Tennessee | 9 | Florida | 0 |
| 3 | December 8, 1928 | Knoxville, TN | Tennessee | 13 | Florida | 12 |
| 4 | December 6, 1930 | Jacksonville, FL | Tennessee | 13 | Florida | 6 |
| 5 | December 3, 1932 | Jacksonville, FL | Tennessee | 32 | Florida | 13 |
| 6 | October 28, 1933 | Knoxville, TN | Tennessee | 13 | Florida | 6 |
| 7 | October 26, 1940 | Knoxville, TN | #5 Tennessee | 14 | Florida | 0 |
| 8 | October 14, 1944 | Knoxville, TN | #15 Tennessee | 40 | Florida | 0 |
| 9 | November 15, 1952 | Knoxville, TN | #7 Tennessee | 26 | #18 Florida | 12 |
| 10 | November 14, 1953 | Gainesville, FL | #18 Tennessee | 9 | Florida | 7 |
| 11 | November 13, 1954 | Knoxville, TN | Florida | 14 | Tennessee | 0 |
| 12 | November 12, 1955 | Gainesville, FL | Tennessee | 20 | Florida | 0 |
| 13 | December 27, 1969 | Jacksonville, FL | #14 Florida | 14 | #11 Tennessee | 13 |
| 14 | October 24, 1970 | Knoxville, TN | #11 Tennessee | 38 | Florida | 7 |
| 15 | October 2, 1971 | Gainesville, FL | #12 Tennessee | 20 | Florida | 13 |
| 16 | October 23, 1976 | Knoxville, TN | #11 Florida | 20 | Tennessee | 18 |
| 17 | October 22, 1977 | Gainesville, FL | #19 Florida | 27 | Tennessee | 17 |
| 18 | October 13, 1984 | Knoxville, TN | #18 Florida | 43 | Tennessee | 30 |
| 19 | October 12, 1985 | Gainesville, FL | #7 Florida | 17 | #14 Tennessee | 10 |
| 20 | October 13, 1990 | Knoxville, TN | #5 Tennessee | 45 | #9 Florida | 3 |
| 21 | October 12, 1991 | Gainesville, FL | #10 Florida | 35 | #4 Tennessee | 18 |
| 22 | September 19, 1992 | Knoxville, TN | #14 Tennessee | 31 | #4 Florida | 14 |
| 23 | September 18, 1993 | Gainesville, FL | #9 Florida | 41 | #5 Tennessee | 34 |
| 24 | September 17, 1994 | Knoxville, TN | #1 Florida | 31 | #15 Tennessee | 0 |
| 25 | September 16, 1995 | Gainesville, FL | #4 Florida | 62 | #8 Tennessee | 37 |
| 26 | September 21, 1996 | Knoxville, TN | #4 Florida | 35 | #2 Tennessee | 29 |
| 27 | September 20, 1997 | Gainesville, FL | #1 Florida | 33 | #4 Tennessee | 20 |
| 28 | September 19, 1998 | Knoxville, TN | #6 Tennessee | 20 | #2 Florida | 17^{OT} |

| No. | Date | Location | Winning team | | Losing team | |
|---|---|---|---|---|---|---|
| 29 | September 18, 1999 | Gainesville, FL | #4 Florida | 23 | #2 Tennessee | 21 |
| 30 | September 16, 2000 | Knoxville, TN | #6 Florida | 27 | #11 Tennessee | 23 |
| 31 | December 1, 2001 | Gainesville, FL | #5 Tennessee | 34 | #2 Florida | 32 |
| 32 | September 21, 2002 | Knoxville, TN | #10 Florida | 30 | #4 Tennessee | 13 |
| 33 | September 20, 2003 | Gainesville, FL | #12 Tennessee | 24 | #17 Florida | 10 |
| 34 | September 18, 2004 | Knoxville, TN | #13 Tennessee | 30 | #11 Florida | 28 |
| 35 | September 17, 2005 | Gainesville, FL | #6 Florida | 16 | #5 Tennessee | 7 |
| 36 | September 16, 2006 | Knoxville, TN | #6 Florida | 21 | #17 Tennessee | 20 |
| 37 | September 15, 2007 | Gainesville, FL | #3 Florida | 59 | #22 Tennessee | 20 |
| 38 | September 20, 2008 | Knoxville, TN | #4 Florida | 30 | Tennessee | 6 |
| 39 | September 19, 2009 | Gainesville, FL | #1 Florida | 23 | Tennessee | 13 |
| 40 | September 18, 2010 | Knoxville, TN | #10 Florida | 31 | Tennessee | 17 |
| 41 | September 17, 2011 | Gainesville, FL | #17 Florida | 33 | Tennessee | 23 |
| 42 | September 15, 2012 | Knoxville, TN | #18 Florida | 37 | #23 Tennessee | 20 |
| 43 | September 21, 2013 | Gainesville, FL | #19 Florida | 31 | Tennessee | 17 |
| 44 | October 4, 2014 | Knoxville, TN | Florida | 10 | Tennessee | 9 |
| 45 | September 26, 2015 | Gainesville, FL | Florida | 28 | Tennessee | 27 |
| 46 | September 24, 2016 | Knoxville, TN | #14 Tennessee | 38 | #19 Florida | 28 |
| 47 | September 16, 2017 | Gainesville, FL | #24 Florida | 26 | #23 Tennessee | 20 |
| 48 | September 22, 2018 | Knoxville, TN | Florida | 47 | Tennessee | 21 |
| 49 | September 21, 2019 | Gainesville, FL | #9 Florida | 34 | Tennessee | 3 |
| 50 | December 5, 2020 | Knoxville, TN | #6 Florida | 31 | Tennessee | 19 |
| 51 | September 25, 2021 | Gainesville, FL | #11 Florida | 38 | Tennessee | 14 |
| 52 | September 24, 2022 | Knoxville, TN | #11 Tennessee | 38 | #20 Florida | 33 |
| 53 | September 16, 2023 | Gainesville, FL | Florida | 29 | #11 Tennessee | 16 |
| 54 | October 12, 2024 | Knoxville, TN | #8 Tennessee | 23 | Florida | 17^{OT} |
| 55 | November 22, 2025 | Gainesville, FL | #20 Tennessee | 31 | Florida | 11 |
Series: Florida leads 32–23

== Notable games ==
=== 1928: Unbeatens in the mud ===
Coming into their 1928 regular season finale, the Gators under head coach Charlie Bachman held an 8–0 record and had outscored their opponents by a nation-leading margin of 324–31. Coach Robert Neyland's Vols had been dominant as well; they were quarterbacked by Bobby Dodd and had outscored their opponents 236–39 and held an 8–0–1 record—the only blemish being a scoreless tie with Kentucky. Still, the Gators were favorites when the teams met in early December, and rumor had it that they would be in line for a Rose Bowl invitation had they prevailed in Knoxville. However, a stingy Vol defense and two failed point after touchdown attempts saw the Gators lose by a single point, 13–12.

In what would become a trend in the series, controversy swirled around the contest. By all accounts, the playing surface had been a muddy mess. Some from Florida claimed that the home team had watered down the field in an effort to slow down the speedy Gator stars, including halfback Red Bethea, quarterback Clyde Crabtree, and ends Dutch Stanley and Dale Van Sickel, who was the program's first All-American. However, other observers opined that the sloppy conditions were the result of heavy rain the night before the game, not home field chicanery.

The teams would not become regular opponents for decades, and the Gators would not earn its first victory over the Vols for nearly a quarter century.

=== 1930: Dodd's final game ===
In the final game in the playing career of Volunteer quarterback and future Hall of Fame coach Bobby Dodd, Tennessee defeated Florida in Jacksonville, 13–6. Buddy Hackman scored both of UT's touchdowns, one on a trick play devised by the senior quarterback. An account of Dodd's trickery: "Against Florida in 1930 he got his teammates in a huddle and told them about a play he had used in high school. When the ball was snapped, it was placed on the ground unattended. The players ran in one direction. Then the center returned, picked up the ball, and waltzed to the winning touchdown." This play would later come to be popularly known as the "fumblerooski", after Nebraska famously used it in the 1984 Orange Bowl versus Miami.

=== 1969–70: Coaching carousel ===
The 9–1 SEC champion Vols and the 8–1–1 Gators were not initially on each other's schedule in 1969. However, they were invited to play in the 1969 Gator Bowl, setting up a rare all-SEC bowl matchup and the only time the squads have faced off outside of the regular season.

The expected high-scoring battle featuring UF's "Super Sophs" passing attack against UT's powerful ground game led by quarterback Bobby Scott never materialized, as both defenses were superb in the Gators' 14–13 win. Quarterback John Reaves connected with wide receiver Carlos Alvarez for the Gators' only offensive touchdown, and the Gator defense stopped the Vols at Florida's one-yard line late in the game to preserve the victory. Fittingly, the game's MVP was a defensive player – Florida linebacker Mike Kelley, who had an interception, a fumble recovery, a blocked punt recovered for a TD, a sack, and 17 tackles.

The 1969 Gator Bowl is remembered less for the actual game then for the coaching changes and rumors of coaching changes that surrounded the contest. Throughout December 1969, rumors had been circulating that Florida's head coach and athletic director Ray Graves, who had been the captain of Tennessee's 1941 football team, would retire from coaching at the conclusion of the season to become UF's full-time AD. Though both Graves and university officials denied the rumor, speculation among fans, players, and media was that Graves would leave the sideline and popular defensive coordinator Gene Ellenson would be promoted to head coach.

The situation intensified in the days preceding the game when word leaked out that Vol head coach Doug Dickey, who had been Florida's starting quarterback in the early 1950s and had grown up in Gainesville, planned to leave UT and replace Graves at UF after their respective teams met in the Gator Bowl. Dickey admitted to reporters that he had been offered the position at Florida, but Graves and UF president Stephen C. O'Connell continued to deny that personnel changes were imminent, with Graves stating that "there is utterly no truth to the rumor."

Despite these denials, Dickey was introduced as the Gators' new head football coach five days after the Gator Bowl contest by Florida's new full-time AD, Ray Graves. Players on both the Florida and Tennessee squads were upset by the move, and after it was reported that Florida officials had been talking to Dickey about the job for months, the NCAA conducted an investigation to determine whether ethics policies were violated. However, no wrongdoing was discovered and Dickey was the Gator head coach for 1970.

The teams did not meet very often in the SEC schedule, but following Georgia Tech's departure, the regular season rotation coincidentally had them facing off in Knoxville the following October. UT fans, who denounced Dickey as a "traitor", eagerly anticipated the match-up and were not disappointed, as the Vols beat his new Florida squad 38–7 behind quarterback Bobby Scott's then-school record 385 passing yards. The Gators assisted the rout by committing four turnovers, including two John Reaves interceptions returned for touchdowns. Both Dickey and Graves remained in their respective positions at UF until the late 1970s, with Dickey fired after the 1978 season and Graves retiring in 1979.

=== 1990: Homecoming ===
Steve Spurrier returned to his alma mater in 1990 to become the Gators' head football coach. In yet another link between the programs, Spurrier had been a star quarterback at Science Hill High School in Johnson City, Tennessee during the early 1960s. Although Knoxville is nearby, he did not seriously consider attending UT because he was an excellent passer and the Vols ran a single-wing offense at the time which featured a running quarterback. Instead, he would choose to return to the state of his birth (Spurrier was born in Miami Beach), eventually becoming the Gators' first Heisman Trophy winner in 1966. Although Tennessee and Florida did not appear on each other's schedule during Spurrier's college playing career, he had returned to Knoxville as a head coach in 1988, when his Duke Blue Devils upset the Vols 31–26.

Emotions ran high when Spurrier brought his first Gator squad to Neyland Stadium in October 1990. Florida was 5–0 and ranked No. 9 coming into the matchup with Johnny Majors' 3–0–2 and No. 5 Vols, marking the first time in series history that both rivals were ranked in the AP top-10 when they faced off. The game began as a defensive struggle, with UT holding a slim 7–3 lead at the half. However, the Vols' Dale Carter returned the second half kickoff 91 yards for a touchdown, igniting the home crowd at Neyland Stadium. The Gators fumbled on their next possession and would turn the ball over six times in the second half. The opportunistic Vols took full advantage, turning Spurrier's homecoming (and, coincidentally, Tennessee's homecoming game) into a 45–3 rout, the largest margin of victory in series history.

=== 1991: "Faxgate" ===
In the week before the 1991 game, media reports began circulating that former UT assistant coach Jack Sells, who had been fired before that season for his role in recruiting violations, had allegedly faxed information about the Vol's offensive gameplan to UF defensive coordinator Ron Zook, himself a former Tennessee assistant. At first, Zook denied receiving any information, but he soon clarified his statement and said that Sells had sent him a fax of "newspaper clippings" about the upcoming game.

Florida won the contest 35–18 behind 245 yards and three touchdowns from Gator quarterback Shane Matthews and five Vol turnovers, but the "faxgate" controversy continued after the final whistle. A follow-up newspaper investigation in Knoxville located an employee of a local Kinko's copy center who said that he had noticed Sells faxing copies of a UT "playbook" and insisted that Sells stop the transmission after over a dozen pages had been sent. The employee had saved the fax cover sheet, which detailed a transmission sent three days before the UF–UT game by a "Jack Sells" to a "Ron Zook" at a Gainesville telephone number.

Head coaches Johnny Majors and Steve Spurrier downplayed the incident, and although Tennessee athletic director (and former Gator quarterback and head football coach) Doug Dickey expressed concern about Sells' actions, Spurrier later said that he and Dickey spoke about the incident on the phone and "laughed about it". Right after the game, Spurrier pointed out that UT gained over 400 yards of offense (including 392 passing yards) in the game and joked that it certainly didn't seem like his defensive staff had any inside information. For his part, Fulmer later admitted that the UT staff had copies of the Gators' offensive playbooks at the time. An SEC investigation concluded without punishment.

Jack Sells, the person at the center of the incident, left the coaching profession and successfully sued Kinko's for privacy violations, though he temporarily moved out of the state of Tennessee after being assaulted by an angry Vols fan in Chattanooga. After a stint as an assistant coach in the NFL, Zook succeeded Spurrier as the Gators' head coach in 2002. He was reluctant to talk about "Faxgate" during his tenure at UF (2002–04), though when asked, he admitted that Sells' infamous transmission had actually been a set of hand-drawn Volunteer offensive plays. However, Zook insisted that they "were so immaterial, and it made no difference and had no relevance, it was nothing."

=== 1995: Second half rain ===
For the third time in five seasons, the No. 8 Vols and No. 4 Gators were both undefeated and ranked in the top ten coming into their annual contest. The squads featured talented young quarterbacks in UT sophomore Peyton Manning and UF junior Danny Wuerffel, and many pregame prognosticators accurately predicted an offense shootout, with Sports Illustrated planning on putting Manning on the cover of their magazine the week after the game.

The Vols struck quickly. On the first play from scrimmage, Manning connected with receiver Joey Kent for a 72-yard gain. On the next play, Manning threw a touchdown pass to Marcus Nash, giving UT a 7–0 lead only 15 seconds into the game. After another Manning touchdown pass and two Gator turnovers, the Vols held a 30–14 advantage late in the second quarter in front of a stunned Florida Field crowd. Wuerffel led the Gators to an answering score, cutting the lead to 30–21 with a touchdown pass in the last minute of the first half. That would be the beginning of a historic run, as Florida scored 48 straight points despite a torrential second half downpour and won in a 62–37 rout. Many records were broken in the game: Wuerffel threw an SEC record six touchdown passes; Tennessee set school records for most points scored in a loss and most points given up in the modern era. After the game, Sports Illustrated chose to put Wuerffel on its cover instead of Manning.

Florida would go 12–0 through the regular season and the SEC Championship Game and played for the national championship in the 1996 Fiesta Bowl, losing in a blowout to Nebraska. Tennessee would not lose another game all season, finishing 11–1 after a Citrus Bowl victory over Ohio State. The schools finished No. 2 and No. 3 in the final polls, with the AP Poll placing the Gators ahead and the Coaches' Poll reversing the order.

The Coaches' Poll was another cause of controversy. Two coaches had voted the Gators out of their top ten, allowing the Vols to slip above them in the final rankings. Since the ballots were submitted secretly, the coaches in question were never identified, but some in the UF program suggested that UT's coach Fulmer had purposely skewed his ballot to improve his team's ranking at the expense of their rival. Fulmer insisted that he had not voted Florida out of his top ten, but did admit that he had ranked them behind his own team.

=== 1996: First half rain ===
Once again, the late September matchup between Tennessee and Florida found both teams ranked in the top 5, with the Volunteers ranked No. 2 and the Gators No. 4 in the AP poll. The game was played in newly expanded Neyland Stadium, and an NCAA record crowd of over 107,000 were in attendance for one of the most highly anticipated games of the college football season.

The tone for the game was set on the Florida's first possession, when the Gator drive stalled and they faced a 4th down and 10 from the UT 35 yard line. Not wanting to attempt a long field goal in the steady rain, and, spurning the punt team, coach Steve Spurrier decided to leave his offense on the field. On the ensuing play, quarterback Danny Wuerffel connected with Reidel Anthony on a post route over the middle for a touchdown that put the Gators up 7–0 and stunned the Volunteer crowd. Teako Brown intercepted Manning on the Vols' first drive, and it took Wuerffel only one play to find the end zone again, hitting Terry Jackson from 10 yards out to extend the lead to 14–0. UF doubled its lead in a 52-second stretch early in the 2nd quarter, as Ike Hilliard and Jacquez Green became the third and fourth different receivers with touchdown receptions on the afternoon, sandwiched around a James Bates interception of Manning. Anthone Lott's 27-yard fumble return stretched the lead to 35–0, before Manning finally got UT on the scoreboard before halftime on a 72-yard strike to Peerless Price.

With the Gators switching to a more conservative game plan in the second half, Tennessee cut the lead to 35–22 with 8 minutes left with 2 more touchdown tosses, including a second to Price. Andy McCellough's 14-yard reception brought the Vols within 35–29 with 10 seconds left, but Florida recovered the ensuing onside kick to secure the six-point victory. Manning threw for 492 passing yards on 65 attempts (both school records) and four touchdowns on the day, but also tossed four interceptions.

Florida went on to win its 4th straight SEC championship and first ever national championship.

=== 1997: Spelling "Citrus" ===
During the mid-1990s, the second highest ranked SEC squad was usually invited to play in the Citrus Bowl after the season. Florida won four consecutive SEC titles from 1993 to 1996, beating Tennessee each time and twice sending them to the Citrus Bowl. Spurrier, who was often known to poke fun at rivals, made jokes at Tennessee's expense during off-season Gator Booster dinners in the spring of 1997, pointing out that "you can't spell Citrus without UT" and suggesting Peyton Manning had returned for his senior season at UT because "he wants to be a three-time Citrus Bowl MVP".

Ironically, even after UF beat UT 33–20 in 1997 for their fifth straight victory in the series, upset losses to LSU and Georgia put the Gators in the Citrus Bowl. Meanwhile, Tennessee and Manning won their first SEC Championship Game and went on to play in the 1998 Orange Bowl.

=== 1998: Fulmer breaks through ===
After Peyton Manning and several other star players moved on to the NFL after the 1997 season, most preseason prognosticators saw Tennessee's 1998 squad as taking a step backward from championship contention. However, they were still ranked No. 6 when the No. 2 Gators rolled into Knoxville looking to beat their rivals for the sixth straight year.

Led by junior quarterback Tee Martin and a stout defense, the Vols recovered four Gators fumbles, held their opponent to −30 yards rushing, and slowed UF's two-quarterback passing attack, which featured Doug Johnson and Jesse Palmer alternating plays. The game was close throughout, with the score knotted at 10 at halftime and 17 at the end of regulation. Tennessee was held to a 41-yard field goal attempt from Jeff Hall during their first possession of overtime. When it was UF's turn, placekicker Collins Cooper missed an answering 32-yard field goal attempt, giving UT a 20–17 win and inspiring the jubilant home fans to rush the turf of Neyland Stadium and tear down the goalposts.

It was not the first last-minute win for the Vols that season, and it would not be the last, either. UT survived several close calls to complete their first perfect season (12–0) since 1938 and claimed their first national championship since 1951 with a 23–16 victory over Florida State in the Fiesta Bowl.

=== 2000: The "Catch?" ===
In front of a record crowd in Neyland Stadium, the Vols were leading the 2000 UF/UT contest on the strength of stifling defense and 175 rushing yards from running back Travis Henry. However, an inability to finish drives led to a school record five field goals from kicker Alex Walls and a slim 23–20 lead.

Down by that score late in the fourth quarter, UF took possession of the ball at their own 9-yard line. Gator quarterback Jesse Palmer steadily led his team down the field, and with 14 seconds left in the game, they found themselves with a first and goal at the Vols' 3.

After a touchdown pass was called back because of an ineligible man downfield penalty, Palmer's next pass was to wide receiver Jabar Gaffney in the endzone. Gaffney held the ball for a brief moment before it was quickly slapped away by Volunteers cornerback Willie Miles. The official in the area signaled a touchdown, ruling that Gaffney had had possession of the ball long enough to be considered a catch. After a brief conference with the referee, the call was confirmed despite strident protests from the UT coaching staff and loud boos from the crowd. The extra point gave Florida a 27–23 victory.

After the game, Volunteer fans were incensed by the call, as they believed Gaffney never gained possession of the ball and that the pass should have been ruled incomplete. Vanderbilt alumnus Al Matthews, the line judge official who made the initial call, received death threats after the game and was not assigned to officiate any games in Knoxville until after Fulmer left.

=== 2001: Season finale ===
As usual, the Gators and Vols were slated to meet on the 3rd Saturday of September during the 2001 season. However, the SEC canceled all games on the weekend following the September 11 attacks, and they were rescheduled for December 1, 2001, requiring the 2001 SEC Championship Game to be pushed back a week as well to December 8.

As the season progressed, the postponed game took on greater and greater importance. Each squad suffered only one close loss (number 6 Tennessee lost to Georgia 26–24, number 1 Florida lost to Auburn 23–20) and entered the contest with Tennessee ranked number 5 and Florida ranked number 2. The winner would represent the SEC East and face LSU in the SEC Championship. With a win in that game, the Gators or Vols were likely to receive an invitation to the Rose Bowl to face the undefeated Big East champion Miami Hurricanes with a national title on the line.

But in 2001, despite the teams' identical records and much to the chagrin of the Vols, the Gators were 17-and-a-half point favorites at kickoff.

Gators starting running back Earnest Graham had been controversially injured in UF's win over rival Florida State the previous week and was unable to play. The star of the game would turn out to be the running back for the other squad, as UT's Travis Stephens rushed 19 times for 226 yards (the second highest total ever given up by a Florida defense) and two touchdowns to lead the Vols' attack. Without Graham, Florida managed only 36 total yards on the ground. Gator quarterback Rex Grossman threw 51 times for 362 yards and two touchdowns, but his pass on a potentially game-tying two-point conversion attempt with 1:10 left in the 4th quarter fell incomplete. The Vols held on for a 34–32 upset victory, ending a 30-year winless drought against Florida in Gainesville.

Ultimately, neither team would win any championships that season. UT was upset by LSU in the SEC Championship Game the following Saturday and missed their opportunity to play for a second national title in four years. The Vols ended up beating Michigan 45–17 in the Citrus Bowl. Florida was invited to the Orange Bowl, where they beat Maryland 56–23.

The teams' December meeting would become even more historical in early January, when Steve Spurrier announced that he was resigning as Florida's head coach after 12 seasons. The 2001 game was thus the last matchup in the Spurrier-Fulmer chapter of the rivalry (they would meet several additional occasions after Spurrier became South Carolina's head coach in 2005) and Spurrier's last home game at Florida Field.

=== 2004: Unsportsmanlike conduct ===
Like the game in Knoxville four years previously, the 2004 UF/UT contest on Tennessee's home field also ended in controversy involving an official's call.

Holding on to a 28–27 lead, Florida was attempting to run the clock out late in the fourth quarter. Florida gained one first down, then were stopped on the subsequent third down play and began to send in the punt team with under a minute left in the game and the clock running.

After the play, however, Gator receiver Dallas Baker and Vols defensive back Jonathan Wade got into an altercation, with Wade head-slapping Baker and Baker responding with a head slap of his own. Referee Bobby Moreau appeared to have a clear view of the incident, but only Baker was called with an unsportsmanlike conduct penalty. The officials had stopped the clock with 55 seconds left in the game to call the penalty and move the Gators back 15 yards, but then incorrectly neglected to restart the clock before the ball was snapped for the punt.

UT received the punt and quickly drove to the Florida 33-yard-line. With six seconds left, placekicker James Wilhoit, who had missed wide right a game-tying extra point earlier in the quarter, earned redemption by hitting a 50-yard field goal, giving his team a 30–28 victory.

The Gator squad and fans were incensed by both the penalty and the subsequent failure to restart the game clock, feeling that the combination of calls had given the Vols an undeserved chance to win the game. Bobby Moreau, the official who called the penalty on Baker, received death threats after the game. SEC director of officials Bobby Gaston subsequently removed Moreau from working games in Gainesville.

=== 2009: Kiffin versus Meyer ===
Lane Kiffin replaced Phil Fulmer as Tennessee's new head coach before the 2009 season. At his introductory press conference, Kiffin boldly predicted that he would "sing Rocky Top all night" in Gainesville after his team beat Florida the following September. Soon after, he incorrectly accused Florida coach Urban Meyer of breaking recruiting rules over a player that ended up going to Tennessee, sparking a series of public jibes between the coaches that continued all through the off-season and helped to make the 2009 meeting the most anticipated game in the series in several years despite the fact that Gators were ranked No. 1 and the Volunteers were unranked.

The game was a relatively uneventful 23–13 Florida win, but the coaches' verbal sparring continued in the post-game press conferences. Meyer suggested that Kiffin had not played to win but had simply tried to "keep it close" and mentioned that the Gators' sluggish play on the afternoon was partly due to the fact that several players, including their star quarterback Tim Tebow, had the flu. From the visiting locker room, Kiffin sarcastically responded that "after we're not excited about our performance, we'll tell you that everybody was sick." Eventually, SEC commissioner Michael Slive publicly warned the coaches to end their war of words, and later sent an official letter of reprimand to Kiffin when he continued to criticize opposing coaches and SEC officials. In January 2010, Kiffin resigned to become the head coach at Southern California, abruptly ending his feud with Meyer after only one season.

=== 2014 – 2017: Comebacks every year ===
Both programs suffered through less successful seasons in the mid-2010s, but while the rivalry faded in national importance, the contests themselves were quite memorable, as four consecutive UF-UT games featured a dramatic fourth quarter rally.

- 2014: For the first time since 1955, both Florida and Tennessee were unranked coming into their matchup in Knoxville. The game was a defensive battle, and Tennessee led 9–0 at halftime on a trio of field goals by kicker Aaron Medley. With starter Jeff Driskel struggling, Florida turned to freshman backup quarterback Treon Harris midway through the third quarter, and the Gator offense was able to ground out a fourth quarter touchdown after a Tennessee fumble deep in their own territory. The defenses held until late in the fourth quarter, when Florida managed to cross into UT territory and kicker Austin Hardin booted a 49-yard field goal – his first successful attempt of the season – to give the Gators their first lead at 10–9. Tennessee had one more chance to respond and crossed midfield before an interception by defensive back Keanu Neal with 51 seconds remaining preserved the Gators' slim road victory.
- 2015: Both teams were again unranked coming into the game, but both programs had hope for the future due to their head coaches – Jim McElwain at Florida and Butch Jones at Tennessee – and the contest in Gainesville was the most hyped-up game in the rivalry in several years. The Vols led 17–7 at halftime and 27–14 with 10 minutes left in the fourth quarter as Florida's offense struggled for much of the game. In the middle of the fourth quarter, freshman quarterback Will Grier led the Gators on a 17-play, 86-yard drive that included two fourth down conversions and ended with a touchdown. The Vols could not run out the clock, and Florida got the ball back with two minutes left down 27–21. On fourth down and 14 yards to go from their own 37-yard line, Grier completed a pass to Antonio Callaway near the first down marker. Callaway wheeled away from a defender and ran untouched down the sideline for a 63-yard touchdown that gave the Gators a 28–27 lead with 1:26 to play.

Tennessee mounted a last-minute drive, and with three seconds left, kicker Aaron Medley lined up to attempt a 55-yard field goal. The kick was badly off target, but the play did not count, as Florida had called timeout right before the snap because they had 12 men on the field. Medley's second attempt sailed just wide, and Florida held on for their 11th straight win in the series.

- 2016: Both Tennessee (No. 14) and Florida (No. 19) were back in the top 20 for their 2016 meeting. However, Tennessee was the "overwhelming" favorite to win the SEC Eastern Division for the first time since 2007 and were a touchdown favorite coming into the rivalry game, especially with Gators' starting quarterback Luke Del Rio injured and unable to play. Still, Florida owned a long winning streak over their rivals, and prior to the game, Florida cornerback Quincy Wilson confidently predicted that it would continue. "Nobody has ever seen a duck pull a truck", he said to reporters. "Florida Gators are going to win, simple as that."

Behind backup quarterback Austin Appleby, Florida jumped out to a 21–0 lead by midway through the second quarter and led 21–3 at the half. In the second half, however, the Volunteer offense came to life behind quarterback Josh Dobbs, who accounted for five touchdowns (four passing, one rushing) against a Florida defense which had only given up one touchdown in their first three and a half games combined. Tennessee's 38 consecutive points (35 in the second half) brought them a 38–28 victory, breaking the Gators' long series win streak in front of a raucous home crowd. "That duck is pulling that truck, baby!" commented Tennessee coach Butch Jones in the postgame news conference.

However, Florida would ultimately win the East. The Vols would go on to beat Georgia on a Hail Mary the following week and achieve a #9 ranking in the AP Poll, but then they would lose 3 consecutive SEC games. This cost them the lead in the SEC East, and Florida would go to the SEC Championship game for the 2nd straight year.

- 2017: The Gators (No. 24) and Volunteers (No. 23) entered their 2017 contest on the edge of the AP rankings, but both Florida's Coach McElwain and Tennessee's Coach Jones were feeling pressure to improve in their third year at their respective programs.

Both teams struggled to score for three quarters, and Florida held a 6–3 lead heading into the final period in Gainesville. The action picked up considerably early in the fourth quarter, beginning when Florida's C. J. Henderson returned an interception for a touchdown. The Vols responded with a long drive that ended with their first touchdown, and the Gators responded with their first offensive touchdown to take a 20–10 lead. Tennessee rallied for another touchdown and then kicked a field goal to tie the score at 20 with under a minute remaining, seemingly sending the contest into overtime. On the ensuing possession, Florida had a first down at their own 37 yard line with nine seconds remaining. Freshman quarterback Feleipe Franks rolled to his right and heaved a Hail Mary pass down the length of the field that wide receiver Tyrie Cleveland caught in the middle of the Tennessee end zone as time expired, giving the Gators a 26–20 win on a play that was dubbed the “Heave to Cleve”.

After the dramatic win, the Gators had few additional opportunities to celebrate in 2017 as they finished 4–7. The Volunteers finished 4–8 and went winless in conference play for the first time in program history. Neither Florida's McElwain nor Tennessee's Jones were still employed by their respective schools at the end of the season, as both head coaches had each been fired in November.

== See also ==
- List of NCAA college football rivalry games

== Bibliography ==
- 2009 Southern Conference Football Media Guide, Year-by-Year Standings, Southern Conference, Spartanburg, South Carolina, pp. 74–77 (2009).
- 2010 Southeastern Conference Football Media Guide, Florida Year-by-year records, Southeastern Conference, Birmingham, Alabama, p. 60 (2010).
- 2011 Florida Gators Football Media Guide, University Athletic Association, Gainesville, Florida, pp. 116–125 (2011).
- Carlson, Norm, University of Florida Football Vault: The History of the Florida Gators, Whitman Publishing, LLC, Atlanta, Georgia (2007). ISBN 0-7948-2298-3.
- Golenbock, Peter, Go Gators! An Oral History of Florida's Pursuit of Gridiron Glory, Legends Publishing, LLC, St. Petersburg, Florida (2002). ISBN 0-9650782-1-3.
- Hairston, Jack, Tales from the Gator Swamp: A Collection of the Greatest Gator Stories Ever Told, Sports Publishing, LLC, Champaign, Illinois (2002). ISBN 1-58261-514-4.
- McCarthy, Kevin M., Fightin' Gators: A History of University of Florida Football, Arcadia Publishing, Mount Pleasant, South Carolina (2000). ISBN 978-0-7385-0559-6.
- McEwen, Tom, The Gators: A Story of Florida Football, The Strode Publishers, Huntsville, Alabama (1974). ISBN 0-87397-025-X.
- Nash, Noel, ed., The Gainesville Sun Presents The Greatest Moments in Florida Gators Football, Sports Publishing, Inc., Champaign, Illinois (1998). ISBN 1-57167-196-X.
- Saylor, Roger, "Southern Intercollegiate Athletic Association", College Football Historical Society, The LA84 Foundation (1993).
