= George Kinard =

American football player (1916–2000)

No. 27, 31
- Position: Guard

Personal information
- Born: October 9, 1916; Crystal Springs, Mississippi, U.S.
- Died: March 23, 2000 (aged 83); Whitfield, Rankin County, Mississippi, U.S.
- Listed height: 6 ft 1 in (1.85 m)
- Listed weight: 202 lb (92 kg)

Career information
- High school: Central (Jackson, Mississippi)
- College: Ole Miss
- NFL draft: 1941: 13th round, 118th overall pick

Career history
- Brooklyn Dodgers (1941–1942); New York Yankees (1946)

Awards and highlights
- Fourth-team All-American (1940)

Career NFL/AAFC statistics
- Games played: 29
- Games started: 12
- Stats at Pro Football Reference

George Truitt Kinard (October 9, 1916 – March 23, 2000) was an American football player.

Kinard was born in Crystal Springs, Mississippi, in 1916. He played college football for the Ole Miss Rebels football team from 1937 to 1940. He was selected by the Central Press Association as a fourth-team guard on the 1940 College Football All-America Team.

He was drafted by the Brooklyn Dodgers with the 118th pick in the 1941 NFL draft and played for the Dodgers during the 1941 and 1942 NFL seasons. He appeared in 17 games for the Dodgers. During World War II, he served in the United States Navy. After the war, he returned to football with the New York Yankees, appearing in 11 AAFC games during the 1946 season.

After retiring from football, Kinard worked in the insurance business. Kinard died in 2000 at age 83 at the Whitfield Nursing Home in Whitfield, Rankin County, Mississippi, in 2000.

Kinard's older brother, Bruiser Kinard, was inducted into the Pro Football Hall of Fame.
