= 1940 Holy Cross Crusaders football team =

American college football season

1940 Holy Cross Crusaders football
- Conference: Independent
- Record: 4–5–1
- Head coach: Joe Sheeketski (2nd season)
- Home stadium: Fitton Field

1940 Eastern college football independents records
	Conf.			Overall
Team	W	L	T	W		L		T
No. 5 Boston College		–		11	–	0	–	0
Duquesne		–		7	–	1	–	0
No. 14 Penn		–		6	–	1	–	1
Penn State		–		6	–	1	–	1
No. 12 Fordham		–		7	–	2	–	0
No. 15 Cornell		–		6	–	2	–	0
La Salle		–		6	–	2	–	0
Princeton		–		5	–	2	–	1
Columbia		–		5	–	2	–	2
Brown		–		6	–	3	–	1
Bucknell		–		4	–	2	–	2
Boston University		–		5	–	3	–	0
Colgate		–		5	–	3	–	0
Hofstra		–		4	–	3	–	0
Harvard		–		3	–	2	–	3
Dartmouth		–		5	–	4	–	0
Temple		–		4	–	4	–	1
Tufts		–		4	–	4	–	0
Vermont		–		4	–	4	–	0
Villanova		–		4	–	5	–	0
Pittsburgh		–		3	–	4	–	1
Syracuse		–		3	–	4	–	1
Buffalo		–		3	–	5	–	0
Carnegie Tech		–		3	–	5	–	0
Manhattan		–		3	–	6	–	0
Providence		–		3	–	6	–	0
NYU		–		2	–	7	–	0
Yale		–		1	–	7	–	0
Army		–		1	–	7	–	1
CCNY		–		1	–	5	–	1
Massachusetts State		–		1	–	8	–	0
Rankings from AP Poll

The 1940 Holy Cross Crusaders football team was an American football team that represented the College of the Holy Cross as an independent during the 1940 college football season. In its second year under head coach Joe Sheeketski, the team compiled a 4–5–1 record.

Holy Cross was ranked at No. 75 (out of 697 college football teams) in the final rankings under the Litkenhous Difference by Score system for 1940.

The team played its home games at Fitton Field in Worcester, Massachusetts.

== Schedule ==
Date	Opponent	Site	Result	Attendance	Source
September 28	Providence	Fitton Field; Worcester, MA	W 34–6	15,000	
October 5	at LSU	Tiger Stadium; Baton Rouge, LA	L 0–25		
October 12	Carnegie Tech	Fitton Field; Worcester, MA	W 18–0	18,000	
October 19	at NYU	Yankee Stadium; Bronx, NY	W 13–7	12,000	
October 26	at Brown	Providence, RI	L 6–9	< 4,000	
November 2	Colgate	Fitton Field; Worcester, MA	L 0–6	4,000	
November 9	Ole Miss	Fitton Field; Worcester, MA	L 6–34	16,000	
November 16	Temple	Fitton Field; Worcester, MA	T 6–6	5,000	
November 23	Manhattan	Fitton Field; Worcester, MA	W 33–25	10,000	
November 30	vs. Boston College	Fenway Park; Boston, MA	L 0–7	38,000	
