= 1940–41 NCAA football bowl games =

College football postseason game series

- Season: 1940
- Number of bowls: 5
- All-star games: Blue–Gray Football Classic; East–West Shrine Game
- Bowl games: January 1, 1941
- Champions: Minnesota Golden Gophers (AP); Boston College Eagles (Various); Tennessee Volunteers (Various); Stanford Indians (Helms, Poling System)
Bowl record by conference
Conference	Bowls	Record	Final AP poll
Independent	3	1–2 (0.333)	7
SEC	2	1–1 (0.500)	2
Big Four	1	1–0 (1.000)	0
PCC	1	1–0 (1.000)	2
SWC	1	1–0 (1.000)	2
Big Six	1	0–1 (0.000)	1
Border	1	0–1 (0.000)	0
Big Ten	0	0–0 (–)	3
Middle Three	0	0–0 (–)	1
Southern	0	0–0 (–)	1
- Note: The final AP poll ranked 19 teams.

The 1940–41 NCAA football bowl games were the final games of the National Collegiate Athletic Association (NCAA) 1940 college football season and featured five bowl games, each of which had been held the previous season. All five bowls were played on January 1, 1941. The national championship, according to recognized selectors, was split by Minnesota, Boston College, Tennessee, and Stanford.

== Poll rankings ==
The below table lists top teams (per the AP poll taken after the completion of the regular season), their win–loss records (prior to bowl games), and the bowls they later played in.

AP	Team	W–L	Conf.	Bowl
1	Minnesota Golden Gophers	8–0	Big Ten	— †
2	Stanford Indians	9–0	PCC	Rose Bowl
3	Michigan Wolverines	7–1	Big Ten	— †
4	Tennessee Volunteers	10–0	SEC	Sugar Bowl
5	Boston College Eagles	10–0	Ind.	Sugar Bowl
6	Texas A&M Aggies	8–1	SWC	Cotton Bowl Classic
7	Nebraska Cornhuskers	8–1	Big Six	Rose Bowl
8	Northwestern Wildcats	6–2	Big Ten	— †
9	Mississippi State Maroons	8–0–1	SEC	Orange Bowl
10	Washington Huskies	7–2	PCC	—
11	Santa Clara Broncos	6–1–1	Ind.	—
12	Fordham Rams	7–1	Ind.	Cotton Bowl Classic
13	Georgetown Hoyas	8–1	Ind.	Orange Bowl
14	Penn Quakers	6–1–1	Ind.	—
15	Cornell Big Red	6–2	Ind.	—
16	SMU Mustangs	7–1–1	SWC	—
17	Hardin–Simmons Cowboys	8–0	Ind.	—
18	Duke Blue Devils	7–2	Southern	—
19	Lafayette Leopards	9–0	Middle Three	—
20	—	—	—	—

Note: Only 19 teams received votes in the final poll.

† The Big Ten Conference did not allow its members to participate in bowl games until the 1947 Rose Bowl.

== Bowl schedule ==
Date	Game	Site	Teams	Affiliations	Results
Jan. 1	Rose Bowl	Rose Bowl; Pasadena, California	#2 Stanford Indians (9–0) #7 Nebraska Cornhuskers (8–1)	PCC; Big Six	Stanford 21; Nebraska 13
Jan. 1	Sugar Bowl	Tulane Stadium; New Orleans, Louisiana	#5 Boston College Eagles (10–0) #4 Tennessee Volunteers (10–0)	Independent; SEC	Boston College 19; Tennessee 13
Jan. 1	Orange Bowl	Burdine Stadium; Miami, Florida	#9 Mississippi State Maroons (9–0–1) #13 Georgetown Hoyas (8–1)	SEC; Independent	Mississippi State 14; Georgetown 7
Jan. 1	Sun Bowl	Kidd Field; El Paso, Texas	Western Reserve Red Cats (7–1); Arizona State Bulldogs (7–1–2)	Big Four; Border	Western Reserve 26; Arizona State 13
Jan. 1	Cotton Bowl Classic	Cotton Bowl; Dallas, Texas	#6 Texas A&M Aggies (8–1) #12 Fordham Rams (7–1)	SWC; Independent	Texas A&M 13; Fordham 12

=== Conference performance in bowl games ===
Conference	Games	Record			Bowls	
Conference	Games	W	L	Pct.	Won	Lost
Independents	3	1	2	.333	Sugar	Cotton, Orange
SEC	2	1	1	.500	Orange	Sugar
Big Four	1	1	0	1.000	Sun	—
Pacific Coast	1	1	0	1.000	Rose	—
SWC	1	1	0	1.000	Cotton	—
Big Six	1	0	1	.000	—	Rose
Border	1	0	1	.000	—	Sun

== Game recaps ==
=== Rose Bowl ===
	1	2	3	4	Total
#2 Stanford	7	7	7	0	21
#7 Nebraska	7	6	0	0	13

Qtr.	Team	Scoring play	Score
1	NEB	Francis 2 yard rush, Francis kick good	NEB 7–0
1	STAN	Gallarneau 10 yard rush, Albert kick good	TIED 7–7
2	NEB	Zikmund 33 yard pass from Rohrig, kick blocked	NEB 13–7
2	STAN	Gallarneau 40 yard pass from Albert, Albert kick good	STAN 14–13
3	STAN	Kmetovic 40 yard punt return, Albert kick good	STAN 21–13

=== Sugar Bowl ===
	1	2	3	4	Total
#5 Boston College	0	0	13	6	19
#4 Tennessee	7	0	6	0	13

Qtr.	Team	Scoring play	Score
1	TENN	Thompson 4 yard rush, Foxx kick good	TENN 7–0
3	BC	Connally 13 yard rush, Maznicki kick good	TIED 7–7
3	TENN	Warren 2 yard rush, kick failed	TENN 13–7
3	BC	Holovak 1 yard rush, kick failed	TIED 13–13
4	BC	O'Rourke 24 yard rush, kick failed	BC 19–13

=== Orange Bowl ===
	1	2	3	4	Total
#9 Mississippi State	7	7	0	0	14
#13 Georgetown	0	0	7	0	7

Qtr.	Team	Scoring play	Score
1	MSST	Tripson blocked punt recovery, Dees kick good	MSST 7–0
2	MSST	Jefferson 2 yard rush, Bruce kick good	MSST 14–0
3	GTWN	Castiglia 2 yard rush, Lio kick good	MSST 14–7

=== Sun Bowl ===
	1	2	3	4	Total
Western Reserve	7	0	6	13	26
Arizona State	0	13	0	0	13

Qtr.	Team	Scoring play	Score
1	WR	Belichick 1 yard rush, Belichick kick good	WR 7–0
2	ASU	Pitts 14 yard pass from Hernandez, kick failed	WR 7–6
2	ASU	Henshaw 94 yard rush, Hernandez kick good	ASU 13–7
3	WR	Waggle 3 yard punt block return, kick failed	TIED 13–13
4	WR	Ries 13 yard rush, Skoczen kick good	WR 20–13
4	WR	Ries 3 yard rush, kick failed	WR 26–13

=== Cotton Bowl Classic ===
	1	2	3	4	Total
#6 Texas A&M	0	0	13	0	13
#12 Fordham	0	6	0	6	12

Qtr.	Team	Scoring play	Score
2	FORD	Filipowicz 2 yard rush, kick blocked	FORD 6–0
3	A&M	Smith 62 yard pass from Pugh, kick failed	TIED 6–6
3	A&M	Kimbrough 1 yard rush, Pugh kick good	A&M 13–6
4	FORD	Blumenstock 15 yard rush, kick blocked	A&M 13–12

== See also ==
- Prairie View Bowl
- Steel Bowl
