= 1940 Carnegie Tech Tartans football team =

American college football season

1940 Carnegie Tech Tartans football
- Conference: Independent
- Record: 3–5
- Head coach: Edward Baker (1st season)
- Home stadium: Pitt Stadium

1940 Eastern college football independents records
	Conf.			Overall
Team	W	L	T	W		L		T
No. 5 Boston College		–		11	–	0	–	0
Duquesne		–		7	–	1	–	0
No. 14 Penn		–		6	–	1	–	1
Penn State		–		6	–	1	–	1
No. 12 Fordham		–		7	–	2	–	0
No. 15 Cornell		–		6	–	2	–	0
La Salle		–		6	–	2	–	0
Princeton		–		5	–	2	–	1
Columbia		–		5	–	2	–	2
Brown		–		6	–	3	–	1
Bucknell		–		4	–	2	–	2
Boston University		–		5	–	3	–	0
Colgate		–		5	–	3	–	0
Hofstra		–		4	–	3	–	0
Harvard		–		3	–	2	–	3
Dartmouth		–		5	–	4	–	0
Temple		–		4	–	4	–	1
Tufts		–		4	–	4	–	0
Vermont		–		4	–	4	–	0
Villanova		–		4	–	5	–	0
Pittsburgh		–		3	–	4	–	1
Syracuse		–		3	–	4	–	1
Buffalo		–		3	–	5	–	0
Carnegie Tech		–		3	–	5	–	0
Manhattan		–		3	–	6	–	0
Providence		–		3	–	6	–	0
NYU		–		2	–	7	–	0
Yale		–		1	–	7	–	0
Army		–		1	–	7	–	1
CCNY		–		1	–	5	–	1
Massachusetts State		–		1	–	8	–	0
Rankings from AP Poll

he 1940 Carnegie Tech Tartans football team represented the Carnegie Institute of Technology—now known as Carnegie Mellon University—as an independent during the 1940 college football season. Led by first-year head coach Edward Baker, the Tartans compiled a record of 3–5.

Carnegie Tech was ranked at No. 116 (out of 697 college football teams) in the final rankings under the Litkenhous Difference by Score system for 1940.

== Schedule ==
Date	Time	Opponent	Site	Result	Attendance	Source
September 28	2:00 p.m.	Geneva	Pitt Stadium; Pittsburgh, PA	W 21–0	6,184	
October 12		at Holy Cross	Fitton Field; Worcester, MA	L 0–18	18,000	
October 19		No. 6 Notre Dame	Notre Dame Stadium; Notre Dame, IN	L 0–61	29,515	
October 26	2:00 p.m.	Case	Pitt Stadium; Pittsburgh, PA	W 14–0	7,212	
November 2		Cincinnati	Nippert Stadium; Cincinnati, OH	L 6–7		
November 9		Pittsburgh	Pitt Stadium; Pittsburgh, PA	L 0–6	26,500	
November 16		Franklin & Marshall	Lancaster, PA	W 18–6		
November 30		Duquesne	Pitt Stadium; Pittsburgh, PA	L 7–14	19,907	
Rankings from AP Poll released prior to the game; All times are in Eastern time
