= 1940 NYU Violets football team =

American college football season

1940 NYU Violets football
- Conference: Independent
- Record: 2–7
- Head coach: Mal Stevens (7th season)
- Home stadium: Ohio Field; Yankee Stadium

1940 Eastern college football independents records
	Conf.			Overall
Team	W	L	T	W		L		T
No. 5 Boston College		–		11	–	0	–	0
Duquesne		–		7	–	1	–	0
No. 14 Penn		–		6	–	1	–	1
Penn State		–		6	–	1	–	1
No. 12 Fordham		–		7	–	2	–	0
No. 15 Cornell		–		6	–	2	–	0
La Salle		–		6	–	2	–	0
Princeton		–		5	–	2	–	1
Columbia		–		5	–	2	–	2
Brown		–		6	–	3	–	1
Bucknell		–		4	–	2	–	2
Boston University		–		5	–	3	–	0
Colgate		–		5	–	3	–	0
Hofstra		–		4	–	3	–	0
Harvard		–		3	–	2	–	3
Dartmouth		–		5	–	4	–	0
Temple		–		4	–	4	–	1
Tufts		–		4	–	4	–	0
Vermont		–		4	–	4	–	0
Villanova		–		4	–	5	–	0
Pittsburgh		–		3	–	4	–	1
Syracuse		–		3	–	4	–	1
Buffalo		–		3	–	5	–	0
Carnegie Tech		–		3	–	5	–	0
Manhattan		–		3	–	6	–	0
Providence		–		3	–	6	–	0
NYU		–		2	–	7	–	0
Yale		–		1	–	7	–	0
Army		–		1	–	7	–	1
CCNY		–		1	–	5	–	1
Massachusetts State		–		1	–	8	–	0
Rankings from AP Poll

The 1940 NYU Violets football team was an American football team that represented New York University as an independent during the 1940 college football season. In their seventh year under head coach Mal Stevens, the team compiled a 2–7 record.

NYU was ranked at No. 131 (out of 697 college football teams) in the final rankings under the Litkenhous Difference by Score system for 1940.

== Schedule ==
Date	Opponent	Site	Result	Attendance	Source
September 28	Pennsylvania Military	Ohio Field; Bronx, NY	W 32–6	8,000	
October 5	Lafayette	Ohio Field; Bronx, NY	L 7–9	12,000	
October 12	Syracuse	Yankee Stadium; Bronx, NY	L 13–47	8,000	
October 19	Holy Cross	Yankee Stadium; Bronx, NY	L 7–13	12,000	
October 26	No. 15 Georgetown	Yankee Stadium; Bronx, NY	L 0–26	11,000	
November 2	at Missouri	Memorial Stadium; Columbia, MO	L 0–33	22,000	
November 9	Franklin & Marshall	Ohio Field; Bronx, NY	W 12–0	10,000	
November 16	at No. 20 Penn State	New Beaver Field; University Park, PA	L 0–25	10,000	
November 30	vs. No. 14 Fordham	Yankee Stadium; Bronx, NY	L 0–26	35,000	
Rankings from AP Poll released prior to the game
