= 1940 Lehigh Engineers football team =

American college football season

1940 Lehigh Engineers football
- Conference: Middle Three Conference
- Record: 2–7 (0–2 Middle Three)
- Head coach: Glen Harmeson (7th season)
- Captain: William Hauseman
- Home stadium: Taylor Stadium

1940 Middle Three Conference football standings
	Conf.					Overall
Team	W		L		T	W		L		T
No. 19 Lafayette $	2	–	0	–	0	9	–	0	–	0
Rutgers	1	–	1	–	0	5	–	3	–	0
Lehigh	0	–	2	–	0	2	–	7	–	0
$ – Conference champion; Rankings from AP Poll

The 1940 Lehigh Engineers football team was an American football team that represented Lehigh University during the 1940 college football season. In its seventh season under head coach Glen Harmeson, the team compiled a 2–7 record, and lost both games against its Middle Three Conference rivals. Lehigh played home games at Taylor Stadium in Bethlehem, Pennsylvania.

Lehigh was ranked at No. 399 (out of 697 college football teams) in the final rankings under the Litkenhous Difference by Score system for 1940.

== Schedule ==
Date	Time	Opponent	Site	Result	Attendance	Source
September 28		at Virginia*	Scott Stadium; Charlottesville, VA	L 0–32	10,000	
October 5	2:00 p.m.	at Case*	Shaw Stadium; Cleveland, OH	L 6–25	2,200	
October 12		Rutgers	Taylor Stadium; Bethlehem, PA	L 0–34	5,000	
October 19		Penn State*	Taylor Stadium; Bethlehem, PA	L 0–34	3,000	
October 26		Hampden–Sydney*	Taylor Stadium; Bethlehem, PA	W 12–7	5,000	
November 2		Haverford*	Taylor Stadium; Bethlehem, PA	L 7–18	2,000	
November 9		Muhlenberg*	Taylor Stadium; Bethlehem, PA	L 6–20	6,000	
November 16		Lowell Textile*	Taylor Stadium; Bethlehem, PA	W 40–7		
November 23		at Lafayette	Fisher Field; Easton, PA (rivalry)	L 0–46	15,000	
*Non-conference game; All times are in Eastern time
