= 1940 Brown Bears football team =

American college football season

1940 Brown Bears football
- Conference: Independent
- Record: 6–3–1
- Head coach: Tuss McLaughry (15th season)
- Home stadium: Brown Stadium

1940 Eastern college football independents records
	Conf.			Overall
Team	W	L	T	W		L		T
No. 5 Boston College		–		11	–	0	–	0
Duquesne		–		7	–	1	–	0
No. 14 Penn		–		6	–	1	–	1
Penn State		–		6	–	1	–	1
No. 12 Fordham		–		7	–	2	–	0
No. 15 Cornell		–		6	–	2	–	0
La Salle		–		6	–	2	–	0
Princeton		–		5	–	2	–	1
Columbia		–		5	–	2	–	2
Brown		–		6	–	3	–	1
Bucknell		–		4	–	2	–	2
Boston University		–		5	–	3	–	0
Colgate		–		5	–	3	–	0
Hofstra		–		4	–	3	–	0
Harvard		–		3	–	2	–	3
Dartmouth		–		5	–	4	–	0
Temple		–		4	–	4	–	1
Tufts		–		4	–	4	–	0
Vermont		–		4	–	4	–	0
Villanova		–		4	–	5	–	0
Pittsburgh		–		3	–	4	–	1
Syracuse		–		3	–	4	–	1
Buffalo		–		3	–	5	–	0
Carnegie Tech		–		3	–	5	–	0
Manhattan		–		3	–	6	–	0
Providence		–		3	–	6	–	0
NYU		–		2	–	7	–	0
Yale		–		1	–	7	–	0
Army		–		1	–	7	–	1
CCNY		–		1	–	5	–	1
Massachusetts State		–		1	–	8	–	0
Rankings from AP Poll

The 1940 Brown Bears football team was an American football team that represented Brown University as an independent during the 1940 college football season. In their 15th year under head coach Tuss McLaughry, the Bears compiled a 6–3–1 record and outscored opponents by a total of 124 to 94.

Brown was ranked at No. 101 (out of 697 college football teams) in the final rankings under the Litkenhous Difference by Score system for 1940.

The team played its home games at Brown Stadium in Providence, Rhode Island.

== Schedule ==
Date	Opponent	Site	Result	Attendance	Source
September 28	at Wesleyan	Andrus Field; Middletown, CT	W 41–0		
October 5	Rhode Island State	Brown Stadium; Providence, RI (rivalry)	W 20–17	14,000	
October 12	Colgate	Brown Stadium; Providence, RI	L 3–20		
October 19	Tufts	Brown Stadium; Providence, RI	W 26–6		
October 26	Holy Cross	Brown Stadium; Providence, RI	W 9–6	< 4,000	
November 2	at Yale	Yale Bowl; New Haven, CT	W 6–2		
November 9	at Army	Michie Stadium; West Point, NY	W 13–9		
November 16	at Harvard	Harvard Stadium; Boston, MA	L 0–14		
November 23	Dartmouth	Brown Stadium; Providence, RI	L 6–20	15,000	
November 28	Columbia	Brown Stadium; Providence, RI	T 0–0	15,000	
