= 1940 La Salle Explorers football team =

American college football season

1940 La Salle Explorers football
- Conference: Independent
- Record: 6–2
- Head coach: Jim Henry (1st season)
- Home stadium: McCarthy Stadium

1940 Eastern college football independents records
	Conf.			Overall
Team	W	L	T	W		L		T
No. 5 Boston College		–		11	–	0	–	0
Duquesne		–		7	–	1	–	0
No. 14 Penn		–		6	–	1	–	1
Penn State		–		6	–	1	–	1
No. 12 Fordham		–		7	–	2	–	0
No. 15 Cornell		–		6	–	2	–	0
La Salle		–		6	–	2	–	0
Princeton		–		5	–	2	–	1
Columbia		–		5	–	2	–	2
Brown		–		6	–	3	–	1
Bucknell		–		4	–	2	–	2
Boston University		–		5	–	3	–	0
Colgate		–		5	–	3	–	0
Hofstra		–		4	–	3	–	0
Harvard		–		3	–	2	–	3
Dartmouth		–		5	–	4	–	0
Temple		–		4	–	4	–	1
Tufts		–		4	–	4	–	0
Vermont		–		4	–	4	–	0
Villanova		–		4	–	5	–	0
Pittsburgh		–		3	–	4	–	1
Syracuse		–		3	–	4	–	1
Buffalo		–		3	–	5	–	0
Carnegie Tech		–		3	–	5	–	0
Manhattan		–		3	–	6	–	0
Providence		–		3	–	6	–	0
NYU		–		2	–	7	–	0
Yale		–		1	–	7	–	0
Army		–		1	–	7	–	1
CCNY		–		1	–	5	–	1
Massachusetts State		–		1	–	8	–	0
Rankings from AP Poll

The 1940 La Salle Explorers football team was an American football team that represented La Salle College (now known as La Salle University) as an independent during the 1940 college football season. In their first year under head coach Jim Henry, the Explorers compiled a 6–2 record.

== Schedule ==
Date	Opponent	Site	Result	Attendance	Source
September 22	at Niagara	Varsity Stadium; Lewiston, NY	L 6–21	5,500	
September 27	at West Chester	Wayne Field; West Chester, PA	W 13–0	9,000	
October 13	at Canisius	Civic Stadium; Buffalo, NY	L 0–6	8,189	
October 19	Davis & Elkins	McCarthy Stadium; Philadelphia, PA	W 19–6	2,000	
October 27	Mount St. Mary's	McCarthy Stadium; Philadelphia, PA	W 13–0	2,000	
November 3	Scranton	McCarthy Stadium; Philadelphia, PA	W 12–6	3,000	
November 10	at Providence	LaSalle Field; Providence, RI	W 13–7	3,000	
November 23	at Pennsylvania Military College	P.M.C. Stadium; Chester, PA	W 31–6		
