= 1940 Colgate Red Raiders football team =

American college football season

1940 Colgate Red Raiders football
- Conference: Independent
- Record: 5–3
- Head coach: Andrew Kerr (12th season)
- Captain: James Garvey
- Home stadium: Colgate Athletic Field

1940 Eastern college football independents records
	Conf.			Overall
Team	W	L	T	W		L		T
No. 5 Boston College		–		11	–	0	–	0
Duquesne		–		7	–	1	–	0
No. 14 Penn		–		6	–	1	–	1
Penn State		–		6	–	1	–	1
No. 12 Fordham		–		7	–	2	–	0
No. 15 Cornell		–		6	–	2	–	0
La Salle		–		6	–	2	–	0
Princeton		–		5	–	2	–	1
Columbia		–		5	–	2	–	2
Brown		–		6	–	3	–	1
Bucknell		–		4	–	2	–	2
Boston University		–		5	–	3	–	0
Colgate		–		5	–	3	–	0
Hofstra		–		4	–	3	–	0
Harvard		–		3	–	2	–	3
Dartmouth		–		5	–	4	–	0
Temple		–		4	–	4	–	1
Tufts		–		4	–	4	–	0
Vermont		–		4	–	4	–	0
Villanova		–		4	–	5	–	0
Pittsburgh		–		3	–	4	–	1
Syracuse		–		3	–	4	–	1
Buffalo		–		3	–	5	–	0
Carnegie Tech		–		3	–	5	–	0
Manhattan		–		3	–	6	–	0
Providence		–		3	–	6	–	0
NYU		–		2	–	7	–	0
Yale		–		1	–	7	–	0
Army		–		1	–	7	–	1
CCNY		–		1	–	5	–	1
Massachusetts State		–		1	–	8	–	0
Rankings from AP Poll

The 1940 Colgate Red Raiders football team was an American football team that represented Colgate University as an independent during the 1940 college football season. In their 12th season under head coach Andrew Kerr, the Red Raiders compiled a 5–3 record and outscored opponents by a total of 125 to 76. James Garvey was the team captain.

Colgate was ranked at No. 43 (out of 697 college football teams) in the final rankings under the Litkenhous Difference by Score system for 1940.

The team played its home games at Colgate Athletic Field in Hamilton, New York.

== Schedule ==
Date	Opponent	Site	Result	Attendance	Source
September 28	Akron	Colgate Athletic Field; Hamilton, NY	W 44–0	6,000	
October 5	at Cornell	Schoellkopf Field; Ithaca, NY (rivalry)	L 0–34	15,000	
October 12	at Brown	Andrews Field; Providence, RI	W 20–3		
October 19	Duke^{†}	Colgate Athletic Field; Hamilton, NY	L 0–13	14,000	
October 26	Mississippi College	Colgate Athletic Field; Hamilton, NY	W 31–0	5,000	
November 2	at Holy Cross	Fitton Field; Worcester, MA	W 6–0	4,000	
November 16	at Syracuse	Archbold Stadium; Syracuse, NY (rivalry)	W 7–6	25,000	
November 23	at Columbia	Baker Field; New York, NY	L 17–20	24,000	
^{†}Homecoming
