= 1940 Manhattan Jaspers football team =

American college football season

1940 Manhattan Jaspers football
- Conference: Independent
- Record: 3–6
- Head coach: Herb Kopf (3rd season)
- Home stadium: Polo Grounds, Yankee Stadium, Triborough Stadium

1940 Eastern college football independents records
	Conf.			Overall
Team	W	L	T	W		L		T
No. 5 Boston College		–		11	–	0	–	0
Duquesne		–		7	–	1	–	0
No. 14 Penn		–		6	–	1	–	1
Penn State		–		6	–	1	–	1
No. 12 Fordham		–		7	–	2	–	0
No. 15 Cornell		–		6	–	2	–	0
La Salle		–		6	–	2	–	0
Princeton		–		5	–	2	–	1
Columbia		–		5	–	2	–	2
Brown		–		6	–	3	–	1
Bucknell		–		4	–	2	–	2
Boston University		–		5	–	3	–	0
Colgate		–		5	–	3	–	0
Hofstra		–		4	–	3	–	0
Harvard		–		3	–	2	–	3
Dartmouth		–		5	–	4	–	0
Temple		–		4	–	4	–	1
Tufts		–		4	–	4	–	0
Vermont		–		4	–	4	–	0
Villanova		–		4	–	5	–	0
Pittsburgh		–		3	–	4	–	1
Syracuse		–		3	–	4	–	1
Buffalo		–		3	–	5	–	0
Carnegie Tech		–		3	–	5	–	0
Manhattan		–		3	–	6	–	0
Providence		–		3	–	6	–	0
NYU		–		2	–	7	–	0
Yale		–		1	–	7	–	0
Army		–		1	–	7	–	1
CCNY		–		1	–	5	–	1
Massachusetts State		–		1	–	8	–	0
Rankings from AP Poll

The 1940 Manhattan Jaspers football team was an American football team that represented Manhattan College as an independent during the 1940 college football season. In its third season under head coach Herb Kopf, the team compiled a 3–5 record and outscored opponents by a total of 165 to 155.

Quarterback Johnny Supulski led the NCAA with 1,190 passing yards.

Manhattan was ranked at No. 73 (out of 697 college football teams) in the final rankings under the Litkenhous Difference by Score system for 1940.

== Schedule ==
Date	Opponent	Site	Result	Attendance	Source
September 28	St. Bonaventure	Triborough Stadium; New York, NY	W 45–0	7,500	
October 4	George Washington	Polo Grounds; New York, NY	L 18–21	8,000	
October 11	Boston University	Polo Grounds; New York, NY	W 20–6	9,233	
November 18	Detroit	Polo Grounds; New York, NY	L 0–6	11,500	
October 25	at Duquesne	Forbes Field; Pittsburgh, PA	L 6–10	12,803	
November 2	at No. 9 Boston College	Alumni Field; Chestnut Hill, MA	L 0–25	12,000	
November 9	Marquette	Yankee Stadium; Bronx, NY	W 45–41	6,000	
November 16	Villanova	Polo Grounds; New York, NY	L 6–13	10,126	
November 23	at Holy Cross	Fitton Field; Worcester, MA	L 25–33	10,000	
Rankings from AP Poll released prior to the game
