= 1940 Vermont Catamounts football team =

American college football season

1940 Vermont Catamounts football
- Conference: Independent
- Record: 4–4
- Head coach: John C. Evans (1st season)
- Home stadium: Centennial Field

1940 Eastern college football independents records
	Conf.			Overall
Team	W	L	T	W		L		T
No. 5 Boston College		–		11	–	0	–	0
Duquesne		–		7	–	1	–	0
No. 14 Penn		–		6	–	1	–	1
Penn State		–		6	–	1	–	1
No. 12 Fordham		–		7	–	2	–	0
No. 15 Cornell		–		6	–	2	–	0
La Salle		–		6	–	2	–	0
Princeton		–		5	–	2	–	1
Columbia		–		5	–	2	–	2
Brown		–		6	–	3	–	1
Bucknell		–		4	–	2	–	2
Boston University		–		5	–	3	–	0
Colgate		–		5	–	3	–	0
Hofstra		–		4	–	3	–	0
Harvard		–		3	–	2	–	3
Dartmouth		–		5	–	4	–	0
Temple		–		4	–	4	–	1
Tufts		–		4	–	4	–	0
Vermont		–		4	–	4	–	0
Villanova		–		4	–	5	–	0
Pittsburgh		–		3	–	4	–	1
Syracuse		–		3	–	4	–	1
Buffalo		–		3	–	5	–	0
Carnegie Tech		–		3	–	5	–	0
Manhattan		–		3	–	6	–	0
Providence		–		3	–	6	–	0
NYU		–		2	–	7	–	0
Yale		–		1	–	7	–	0
Army		–		1	–	7	–	1
CCNY		–		1	–	5	–	1
Massachusetts State		–		1	–	8	–	0
Rankings from AP Poll

The 1940 Vermont Catamounts football team was an American football team that represented the University of Vermont as an independent during the 1940 college football season. In their first year under head coach John C. Evans, the team compiled a 4–4 record.

Vermont was ranked at No. 284 (out of 697 college football teams) in the final rankings under the Litkenhous Difference by Score system for 1940.

== Schedule ==
Date	Opponent	Site	Result	Attendance	Source
September 28	Northeastern	Centennial Field; Burlington, VT	W 7–0	2,500	
October 5	at Trinity (CT)	Trinity Field; Hartford, CT	L 3–8		
October 12	Colby^{†}	Centennial Field; Burlington, VT	L 7–10		
October 19	at Union (NY)	Alexander Field; Schenectady, NY	W 19–7		
October 26	New Hampshire	Centennial Field; Burlington, VT	W 33–13	2,000	
November 2	at RPI	Troy, NY	L 0–12		
November 9	Norwich	Centennial Field; Burlington, VT	L 7–38		
November 16	at Middlebury	Porter Field; Middlebury, VT	W 32–0		
^{†}Homecoming
