= William H. Wood (American football) =

United States Army general

Biographical details
- Born: September 6, 1900; Waterbury, Connecticut, U.S.
- Died: June 7, 1988 (aged 87); Easton, Maryland, U.S.

Playing career

Football
- 1921–1924: Army

Basketball
- 1921–1925: Army

Baseball
- 1922–1925: Army
- Position: Fullback (football)

Coaching career (HC unless noted)

Football
- 1925–1928: Army (assistant)
- 1932–1938: Army (assistant)
- 1938–1940: Army

Head coaching record
- Overall: 12–13–3

William Holmes Wood (September 6, 1900 – June 7, 1988) was an American football, basketball, and baseball player, coach of football, and United States Army officer. He served as the head football coach at the United States Military Academy from 1938 to 1940, compiling a record of 12–13–3.

== Biography ==
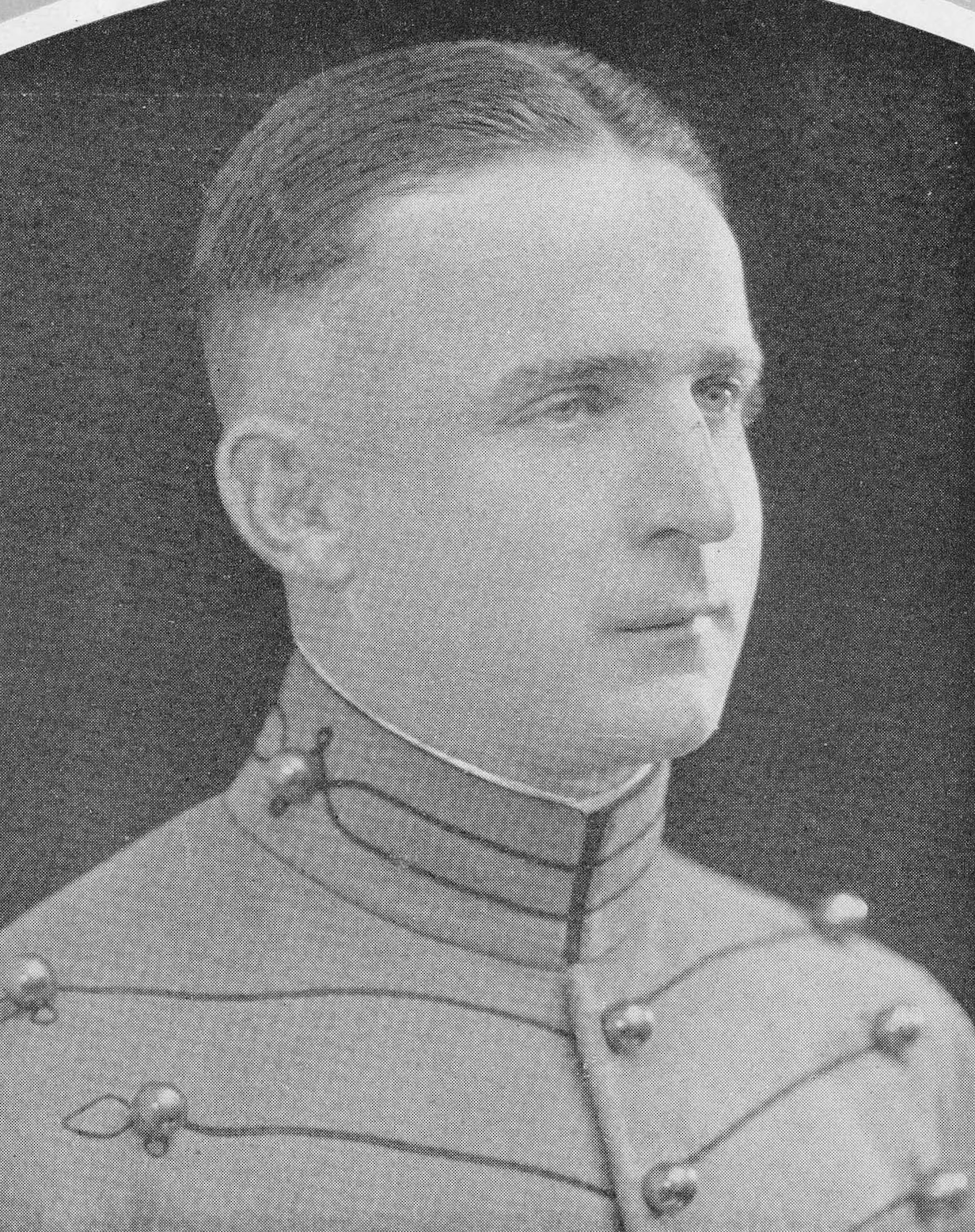
At West Point in 1925

Wood was born in Waterbury, Connecticut, on September 6, 1900, and raised in Baltimore, Maryland. After graduating from Baltimore Polytechnic Institute, he attended Johns Hopkins University, before transferring to the United States Military Academy at West Point. There he lettered in three sports, and graduated in 1925.

He married Elizabeth Tuttle in Chicago on April 30, 1927.

Serving in China and Europe during World War II, Wood was chief of staff of the 13th Armored Division. His decorations included the Legion of Merit and the Bronze Star Medal. He retired from the Army in 1956 after rising to the rank of brigadier general.

Wood died at the age of 87 on June 7, 1988, at the William Hill Health Care Center in Easton, Maryland. He had been stricken with Alzheimer's disease. He was buried at Arlington National Cemetery.

== Head coaching record ==
Year	Team	Overall	Conference	Standing	Bowl/playoffs
Army Cadets (Independent) (1938–1940)
1938	Army	8–2			
1939	Army	3–4–2			
1940	Army	1–7–1			
Army:		12–13–3			
Total:		12–13–3			
