= 1940 Massachusetts State Aggies football team =

American college football season

1940 Massachusetts State Aggies football
- Conference: Independent
- Record: 1–8
- Head coach: Elbert Carraway (5th season)
- Home stadium: Alumni Field

1940 Eastern college football independents records
	Conf.			Overall
Team	W	L	T	W		L		T
No. 5 Boston College		–		11	–	0	–	0
Duquesne		–		7	–	1	–	0
No. 14 Penn		–		6	–	1	–	1
Penn State		–		6	–	1	–	1
No. 12 Fordham		–		7	–	2	–	0
No. 15 Cornell		–		6	–	2	–	0
La Salle		–		6	–	2	–	0
Princeton		–		5	–	2	–	1
Columbia		–		5	–	2	–	2
Brown		–		6	–	3	–	1
Bucknell		–		4	–	2	–	2
Boston University		–		5	–	3	–	0
Colgate		–		5	–	3	–	0
Hofstra		–		4	–	3	–	0
Harvard		–		3	–	2	–	3
Dartmouth		–		5	–	4	–	0
Temple		–		4	–	4	–	1
Tufts		–		4	–	4	–	0
Vermont		–		4	–	4	–	0
Villanova		–		4	–	5	–	0
Pittsburgh		–		3	–	4	–	1
Syracuse		–		3	–	4	–	1
Buffalo		–		3	–	5	–	0
Carnegie Tech		–		3	–	5	–	0
Manhattan		–		3	–	6	–	0
Providence		–		3	–	6	–	0
NYU		–		2	–	7	–	0
Yale		–		1	–	7	–	0
Army		–		1	–	7	–	1
CCNY		–		1	–	5	–	1
Massachusetts State		–		1	–	8	–	0
Rankings from AP Poll

The 1940 Massachusetts State Aggies football team represented Massachusetts State College in the 1940 college football season. The team was coached by Elbert Carraway and played its home games at Alumni Field in Amherst, Massachusetts. Mass State finished the season with a record of 1–8.

== Schedule ==
Date	Opponent	Site	Result	Attendance
September 28	Springfield	Alumni Field; Amherst, MA	L 6–13	
October 5	at Connecticut	Gardner Dow Athletic Fields; Storrs, CT (rivalry)	L 0–13	
October 12	at Norwich	Sabine Field; Northfield, VT	L 0–24	
October 19	Rhode Island State	Alumni Field; Amherst, MA	L 3–9	
October 26	at Worcester Tech	Alumni Field; Worcester, MA	W 12–6	
November 2	at Amherst	Pratt Field; Amherst, MA	L 0–14	
November 12	at Coast Guard	Cadet Memorial Field; New London, CT	L 6–19	
November 16	at RPI	'86 Field; Troy, NY	L 0–25	
November 23	at Tufts	Tufts Oval; Somerville, MA	L 6–19	
