= 1940 Bucknell Bison football team =

American college football season

1940 Bucknell Bison football
- Conference: Independent
- Record: 4–2–2
- Head coach: Al Humphreys (4th season)
- Home stadium: Memorial Stadium

1940 Eastern college football independents records
	Conf.			Overall
Team	W	L	T	W		L		T
No. 5 Boston College		–		11	–	0	–	0
Duquesne		–		7	–	1	–	0
No. 14 Penn		–		6	–	1	–	1
Penn State		–		6	–	1	–	1
No. 12 Fordham		–		7	–	2	–	0
No. 15 Cornell		–		6	–	2	–	0
La Salle		–		6	–	2	–	0
Princeton		–		5	–	2	–	1
Columbia		–		5	–	2	–	2
Brown		–		6	–	3	–	1
Bucknell		–		4	–	2	–	2
Boston University		–		5	–	3	–	0
Colgate		–		5	–	3	–	0
Hofstra		–		4	–	3	–	0
Harvard		–		3	–	2	–	3
Dartmouth		–		5	–	4	–	0
Temple		–		4	–	4	–	1
Tufts		–		4	–	4	–	0
Vermont		–		4	–	4	–	0
Villanova		–		4	–	5	–	0
Pittsburgh		–		3	–	4	–	1
Syracuse		–		3	–	4	–	1
Buffalo		–		3	–	5	–	0
Carnegie Tech		–		3	–	5	–	0
Manhattan		–		3	–	6	–	0
Providence		–		3	–	6	–	0
NYU		–		2	–	7	–	0
Yale		–		1	–	7	–	0
Army		–		1	–	7	–	1
CCNY		–		1	–	5	–	1
Massachusetts State		–		1	–	8	–	0
Rankings from AP Poll

The 1940 Bucknell Bison football team was an American football team that represented Bucknell University as an independent during the 1940 college football season. In their fourth season under head coach Al Humphreys, the Bison compiled a 4–2–2 record and outscored opponents by a total of 73 to 33.

Bucknell was ranked at No. 114 (out of 697 college football teams) in the final rankings under the Litkenhous Difference by Score system for 1940.

The team played its home games at Memorial Stadium in Lewisburg, Pennsylvania.

== Schedule ==
Date	Opponent	Site	Result	Attendance	Source
October 5	at Penn State	New Beaver Field; State College, PA	L 0–9	14,000	
October 12	Ursinus	Memorial Stadium; Lewisburg, PA	W 33–7		
October 18	at Western Maryland	Baltimore Stadium; Baltimore, MD	T 0–0	4,000	
November 2	Temple^{†}	Memorial Stadium; Lewisburg, PA	L 7–10	10,000	
November 9	at George Washington	Griffith Stadium; Washington, DC	T 0–0	7,000	
November 16	at Gettysburg	Memorial Field; Gettysburg, PA	W 20–7		
November 23	Muhlenberg	Memorial Stadium; Lewisburg, PA	W 6–0		
November 28	at Albright	Reading, PA	W 7–0		
^{†}Homecoming
