= 1940 Northeastern Huskies football team =

American college football season

1940 Northeastern Huskies football
- Conference: New England Conference
- Record: 2–6 (0–1 New England)
- Head coach: James W. Dunn (4th season)
- Home stadium: Kent Street Field

1940 New England Conference football standings
	Conf.					Overall
Team	W		L		T	W		L		T
New Hampshire $	2	–	0	–	0	5	–	3	–	0
Rhode Island State	2	–	1	–	0	5	–	3	–	0
Connecticut	1	–	2	–	0	4	–	4	–	0
Maine	1	–	2	–	0	1	–	6	–	0
Northeastern	0	–	1	–	0	2	–	6	–	0
$ – Conference champion

The 1940 Northeastern Huskies football team represented Northeastern University as a member of the New England Conference (NEC) during the 1940 college football season. Led by fourth-year head coach James W. Dunn, the Lions compiled an overall record of 2–6, with a conference record of 0–1, and finished fifth in the NEC.

== Schedule ==
Date	Opponent	Site	Result	Attendance	Source
September 21	at Rhode Island State	Meade Field; Kingston, RI	L 0–10		
September 28	at Vermont*	Centennial Field; Burlington, VT	L 0–7	2,500	
October 5	American International*	Kent Street Field; Brookline, MA	L 0–12		
October 12	at Springfield*	Pratt Field; Springfield, MA	W 12–7		
October 19	Bates*	Kent Street Field; Brookline, MA	W 12–3		
October 26	at Upsala*	East Orange, NJ	L 6–7		
November 2	Tufts*	Kent Street Field; Brookline, MA	L 2–12		
November 9	at Saint Anselm*	Manchester, NH	L 0–12		
*Non-conference game
