= 1940 Army Cadets football team =

American college football season

1940 Army Cadets football
- Conference: Independent
- Record: 1–7–1
- Head coach: William H. Wood (3rd season)
- Captain: William Gillis
- Home stadium: Michie Stadium

1940 Eastern college football independents records
	Conf.			Overall
Team	W	L	T	W		L		T
No. 5 Boston College		–		11	–	0	–	0
Duquesne		–		7	–	1	–	0
No. 14 Penn		–		6	–	1	–	1
Penn State		–		6	–	1	–	1
No. 12 Fordham		–		7	–	2	–	0
No. 15 Cornell		–		6	–	2	–	0
La Salle		–		6	–	2	–	0
Princeton		–		5	–	2	–	1
Columbia		–		5	–	2	–	2
Brown		–		6	–	3	–	1
Bucknell		–		4	–	2	–	2
Boston University		–		5	–	3	–	0
Colgate		–		5	–	3	–	0
Hofstra		–		4	–	3	–	0
Harvard		–		3	–	2	–	3
Dartmouth		–		5	–	4	–	0
Temple		–		4	–	4	–	1
Tufts		–		4	–	4	–	0
Vermont		–		4	–	4	–	0
Villanova		–		4	–	5	–	0
Pittsburgh		–		3	–	4	–	1
Syracuse		–		3	–	4	–	1
Buffalo		–		3	–	5	–	0
Carnegie Tech		–		3	–	5	–	0
Manhattan		–		3	–	6	–	0
Providence		–		3	–	6	–	0
NYU		–		2	–	7	–	0
Yale		–		1	–	7	–	0
Army		–		1	–	7	–	1
CCNY		–		1	–	5	–	1
Massachusetts State		–		1	–	8	–	0
Rankings from AP Poll

The 1940 Army Cadets football team represented the United States Military Academy as an independent during the 1940 college football season. In their third and final year under head coach William H. Wood, the Cadets compiled a 1–7–1 record and were outscored their opponents by a combined total of 197 to 54. The season was the first since 1899 in which the Army football team was outscored by its opponents. In the annual Army–Navy Game, the Cadets lost to the Midshipmen by a 14 to 0 score. The Cadets also suffered blowout defeats to Cornell (45-0) and Penn (48-0).

No Army players were honored on the All-America team. Three weeks after the end of the 1940 season, the War Department ordered coach Wood back to active troop duty and named Earl Blaik as head coach for the 1941 season.

Army was ranked at No. 119 (out of 697 college football teams) in the final rankings under the Litkenhous Difference by Score system for 1940.

== Schedule ==
Date	Opponent	Site	Result	Attendance	Source
October 5	Williams	Michie Stadium; West Point, NY	W 20–19		
October 12	Cornell	Michie Stadium; West Point, NY	L 0–45	27,917	
October 19	at Harvard	Harvard Stadium; Boston, MA	T 6–6	30,000	
October 26	Lafayette	Michie Stadium; West Point, NY	L 0–19	20,000	
November 2	vs. No. 2 Notre Dame	Yankee Stadium; Bronx, NY (rivalry)	L 0–7	75,474	
November 9	Brown	Michie Stadium; West Point, NY	L 9–13	35,000	
November 16	at Penn	Franklin Field; Philadelphia, PA	L 0–48	47,000	
November 23	at Princeton	Palmer Stadium; Princeton, NJ	L 19–26	26,000	
November 30	vs. Navy	Philadelphia Municipal Stadium; Philadelphia, PA (Army–Navy Game)	L 0–14	102,000	
Rankings from AP Poll released prior to the game
