= 1940 Rutgers Queensmen football team =

American college football season

1940 Rutgers Queensmen football
- Conference: Middle Three Conference
- Record: 5–3 (1–1 Middle Three)
- Head coach: Harvey Harman (3rd season)
- Captain: Milton Nelson
- Home stadium: Rutgers Stadium

1940 Middle Three Conference football standings
	Conf.					Overall
Team	W		L		T	W		L		T
No. 19 Lafayette $	2	–	0	–	0	9	–	0	–	0
Rutgers	1	–	1	–	0	5	–	3	–	0
Lehigh	0	–	2	–	0	2	–	7	–	0
$ – Conference champion; Rankings from AP Poll

The 1940 Rutgers Queensmen football team represented Rutgers University in the 1940 college football season. In their third season under head coach Harvey Harman, the Queensmen compiled a 5–3 record and outscored their opponents 211 to 56.

Rutgers was ranked at No. 100 (out of 697 college football teams) in the final rankings under the Litkenhous Difference by Score system for 1940.

== Schedule ==
Date	Opponent	Site	Result	Attendance	Source
October 5	Springfield	Rutgers Stadium; Piscataway, NJ	W 33–0	8,000	
October 12	at Lehigh	Taylor Stadium; Bethlehem, PA	W 34–0		
October 19	Marietta	Rutgers Stadium; Piscataway, NJ	W 53–0	5,000	
October 26	at Princeton	Palmer Stadium; Princeton, NJ (rivalry)	L 13–28		
November 2	Connecticut	Rutgers Stadium; Piscataway, NJ	W 45–7	7,000	
November 9	Lafayette^{†}	Rutgers Stadium; Piscataway, NJ	L 6–7	19,000	
November 16	St. Lawrence	Rutgers Stadium; Piscataway, NJ	W 20–0	3,200	
November 21	at Maryland	Memorial Stadium; Baltimore, MD	L 7–14	5,000	
^{†}Homecoming
