= 1940 CCNY Beavers football team =

American college football season

1940 CCNY Beavers football
- Conference: Independent
- Record: 1–5–1
- Head coach: Benny Friedman (7th season)
- Home stadium: Lewisohn Stadium

1940 Eastern college football independents records
	Conf.			Overall
Team	W	L	T	W		L		T
No. 5 Boston College		–		11	–	0	–	0
Duquesne		–		7	–	1	–	0
No. 14 Penn		–		6	–	1	–	1
Penn State		–		6	–	1	–	1
No. 12 Fordham		–		7	–	2	–	0
No. 15 Cornell		–		6	–	2	–	0
La Salle		–		6	–	2	–	0
Princeton		–		5	–	2	–	1
Columbia		–		5	–	2	–	2
Brown		–		6	–	3	–	1
Bucknell		–		4	–	2	–	2
Boston University		–		5	–	3	–	0
Colgate		–		5	–	3	–	0
Hofstra		–		4	–	3	–	0
Harvard		–		3	–	2	–	3
Dartmouth		–		5	–	4	–	0
Temple		–		4	–	4	–	1
Tufts		–		4	–	4	–	0
Vermont		–		4	–	4	–	0
Villanova		–		4	–	5	–	0
Pittsburgh		–		3	–	4	–	1
Syracuse		–		3	–	4	–	1
Buffalo		–		3	–	5	–	0
Carnegie Tech		–		3	–	5	–	0
Manhattan		–		3	–	6	–	0
Providence		–		3	–	6	–	0
NYU		–		2	–	7	–	0
Yale		–		1	–	7	–	0
Army		–		1	–	7	–	1
CCNY		–		1	–	5	–	1
Massachusetts State		–		1	–	8	–	0
Rankings from AP Poll

The 1940 CCNY Beavers football team was an American football team that represented the City College of New York (CCNY) as an independent during the 1940 college football season. In their seventh season under head coach Benny Friedman, the team compiled a 1–5–1 record.

CCNY was ranked at No. 444 (out of 697 college football teams) in the final rankings under the Litkenhous Difference by Score system for 1940.

== Schedule ==
Date	Opponent	Site	Result	Attendance	Source
September 28	Montclair State	Lewisohn Stadium; New York, NY	L 12–13		
October 5	Colby	Lewisohn Stadium; New York, NY	L 0–14		
October 19	at Clarkson	Snell Field; Potsdam, NY	T 0–0		
October 26	Susquehanna	Lewisohn Stadium; New York, NY	L 7–14		
November 2	at Buffalo	Rotary Stadium; Buffalo, NY	L 6–7		
November 9	Springfield	Lewisohn Stadium; New York, NY	W 13–7	3,000	
November 16	at Brooklyn	Brooklyn College Field; Brooklyn, NY	L 6–14	3,500	
