= 1940 New Hampshire Wildcats football team =

American college football season

1940 New Hampshire Wildcats football
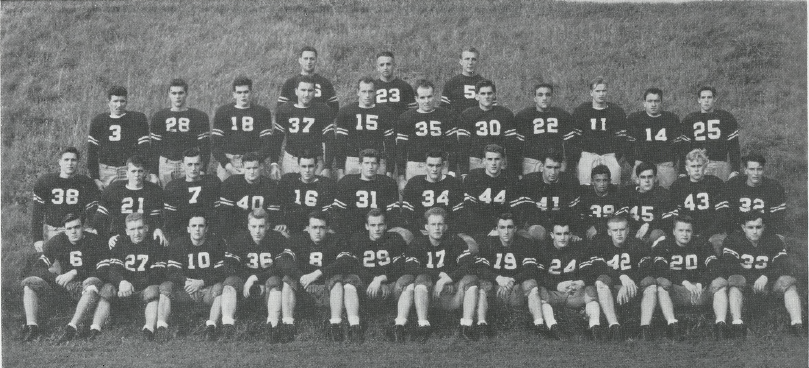
- Conference: New England Conference
- Record: 5–3 (2–0 New England)
- Head coach: George Sauer (4th season)
- Captain: Matthew Flaherty
- Home stadium: Lewis Field

1940 New England Conference football standings
	Conf.					Overall
Team	W		L		T	W		L		T
New Hampshire $	2	–	0	–	0	5	–	3	–	0
Rhode Island State	2	–	1	–	0	5	–	3	–	0
Connecticut	1	–	2	–	0	4	–	4	–	0
Maine	1	–	2	–	0	1	–	6	–	0
Northeastern	0	–	1	–	0	2	–	6	–	0
$ – Conference champion

The 1940 New Hampshire Wildcats football team was an American football team that represented the University of New Hampshire as a member of the New England Conference during the 1940 college football season. In its fourth year under head coach George Sauer, the team compiled a 5–3 record, outscoring their opponents 121–86.

New Hampshire was ranked at No. 218 (out of 697 college football teams) in the final rankings under the Litkenhous Difference by Score system for 1940.

The team played its home games at Lewis Field (also known as Lewis Stadium) in Durham, New Hampshire.

== Schedule ==
Date	Opponent	Site	Result	Attendance	Source
September 28	at Colby*	Waterville, ME	L 19–21		
October 5	Bates*	Lewis Field; Durham, NH	W 27–6		
October 12	Maine^{†}	Lewis Field; Durham, NH (rivalry)	W 20–14	8,000	
October 19	Springfield*	Lewis Field; Durham, NH	W 19–6		
October 26	at Vermont*	Centennial Field; Burlington, VT	L 13–33	2,000	
November 2	at Saint Anselm*	Manchester, NH	L 0–6	200	
November 9	at Tufts*	Tufts Oval; Medford, MA	W 14–0		
November 16	Connecticut	Lewis Field; Durham, NH	W 9–0		
*Non-conference game; ^{†}Homecoming; Source:

The 1940 game remains the last time that the Saint Anselm and New Hampshire football programs have met.

New Hampshire captain Matthew Flaherty was inducted to the university's athletic hall of fame in 1983. Flaherty served in World War II, was a teacher and basketball coach at nearby Dover High School, and later became a high school principal; he died in November 2004 at age 86.
