= 1940 Connecticut Huskies football team =

American college football season

1940 Connecticut Huskies football
- Conference: New England Conference
- Record: 4–4 (1–2 New England)
- Head coach: J. Orlean Christian (7th season)
- Home stadium: Gardner Dow Athletic Fields

1940 New England Conference football standings
	Conf.					Overall
Team	W		L		T	W		L		T
New Hampshire $	2	–	0	–	0	5	–	3	–	0
Rhode Island State	2	–	1	–	0	5	–	3	–	0
Connecticut	1	–	2	–	0	4	–	4	–	0
Maine	1	–	2	–	0	1	–	6	–	0
Northeastern	0	–	1	–	0	2	–	6	–	0
$ – Conference champion

The 1940 Connecticut Huskies football team represented the University of Connecticut in the 1940 college football season. The Huskies were led by seventh-year head coach J. Orlean Christian and completed the season with a record of 4–4.

Connecticut was ranked at No. 315 (out of 697 college football teams) in the final rankings under the Litkenhous Difference by Score system for 1940.

== Schedule ==
Date	Opponent	Site	Result	Attendance	Source
September 27	Coast Guard*	Cadet Memorial Field; New London, CT	W 10–9		
October 5	Massachusetts State*	Gardner Dow Athletic Fields; Storrs, CT (rivalry)	W 13–0		
October 12	Wesleyan*	Gardner Dow Athletic Fields; Storrs, CT	W 6–0		
October 19	at Maine	Orono, ME	W 13–6		
October 26	Buffalo*	Gardner Dow Athletic Fields; Storrs, CT	L 6–7		
November 2	at Rutgers*	Rutgers Stadium; New Brunswick, NJ	L 7–45	7,000	
November 9	Rhode Island State	Gardner Dow Athletic Fields; Storrs, CT (rivalry)	L 12–13	7,000	
November 16	at New Hampshire	Lewis Field; Durham, NH	L 0–9		
*Non-conference game
