= 1940 Maine Black Bears football team =

American college football season

1940 Maine Black Bears football
- Conference: New England Conference, Maine Intercollegiate Athletic Association
- Record: 1–6 (1–2 New England, 0–3 MIAA)
- Head coach: Fred Brice (20th season)
- Captain: Roger Stearns
- Home stadium: Alumni Field

1940 New England Conference football standings
	Conf.					Overall
Team	W		L		T	W		L		T
New Hampshire $	2	–	0	–	0	5	–	3	–	0
Rhode Island State	2	–	1	–	0	5	–	3	–	0
Connecticut	1	–	2	–	0	4	–	4	–	0
Maine	1	–	2	–	0	1	–	6	–	0
Northeastern	0	–	1	–	0	2	–	6	–	0
$ – Conference champion

The 1940 Maine Black Bears football team was an American football team that represented the University of Maine as a member of the New England Conference and Maine Intercollegiate Athletic Association during the 1940 college football season. In its 20th and final season under head coach Fred Brice, the team compiled a 1–6 record (1–2 against New England conference and 0–3 against MIAA opponents). The team played its home games at Alumni Field in Orono, Maine. Roger Stearns was the team captain.

Maine was ranked at No. 313 (out of 697 college football teams) in the final rankings under the Litkenhous Difference by Score system for 1940.

== Schedule ==
Date	Opponent	Site	Result	Attendance	Source
September 29	Rhode Island State	Alumni Field; Orono, ME	W 7–0	5,000	
October 5	at Columbia*	Baker Field; New York, NY	L 0–15		
October 12	at New Hampshire	Lewis Field; Durham, NH (rivalry)	L 14–20	8,000	
October 19	Connecticut	Alumni Field; Orono, ME	L 6–13		
October 26	Bates	Alumni Field; Orono, ME	L 6–7		
November 2	Colby	Alumni Field; Orono, ME	L 0–20		
November 9	at Bowdoin*	Whittier Field; Brunswick, ME	L 0–19	11,000	
*Non-conference game
