= 1940 Temple Owls football team =

American college football season

1940 Temple Owls football
- Conference: Independent
- Record: 4–4–1
- Head coach: Ray Morrison (1st season)
- Captain: Charles Drulis
- Home stadium: Temple Stadium

1940 Eastern college football independents records
	Conf.			Overall
Team	W	L	T	W		L		T
No. 5 Boston College		–		11	–	0	–	0
Duquesne		–		7	–	1	–	0
No. 14 Penn		–		6	–	1	–	1
Penn State		–		6	–	1	–	1
No. 12 Fordham		–		7	–	2	–	0
No. 15 Cornell		–		6	–	2	–	0
La Salle		–		6	–	2	–	0
Princeton		–		5	–	2	–	1
Columbia		–		5	–	2	–	2
Brown		–		6	–	3	–	1
Bucknell		–		4	–	2	–	2
Boston University		–		5	–	3	–	0
Colgate		–		5	–	3	–	0
Hofstra		–		4	–	3	–	0
Harvard		–		3	–	2	–	3
Dartmouth		–		5	–	4	–	0
Temple		–		4	–	4	–	1
Tufts		–		4	–	4	–	0
Vermont		–		4	–	4	–	0
Villanova		–		4	–	5	–	0
Pittsburgh		–		3	–	4	–	1
Syracuse		–		3	–	4	–	1
Buffalo		–		3	–	5	–	0
Carnegie Tech		–		3	–	5	–	0
Manhattan		–		3	–	6	–	0
Providence		–		3	–	6	–	0
NYU		–		2	–	7	–	0
Yale		–		1	–	7	–	0
Army		–		1	–	7	–	1
CCNY		–		1	–	5	–	1
Massachusetts State		–		1	–	8	–	0
Rankings from AP Poll

The 1940 Temple Owls football team was an American football team that represented Temple University as an independent during the 1940 college football season. In its first season under head coach Ray Morrison, the team compiled a 4–4–1 record and outscored opponents by a total of 155 to 113. Charles Drulis was the team captain.

Temple was ranked at No. 35 (out of 697 college football teams) in the final rankings under the Litkenhous Difference by Score system for 1940.

The team played its home games at Temple Stadium in Philadelphia.

== Schedule ==
Date	Opponent	Site	Result	Attendance	Source
September 27	Muhlenberg	Temple Stadium; Philadelphia, PA	W 64–7	12,000	
October 4	Georgetown	Temple Stadium; Philadelphia, PA	L 0–14	20,000	
October 12	at Boston College	Fenway Park; Boston, MA	L 20–33	28,000	
October 18	Michigan State	Temple Stadium; Philadelphia, PA	W 21–19	15,000	
October 26	Penn State	Temple Stadium; Philadelphia, PA	L 0–18	25,000	
November 2	at Bucknell	Lewisburg, PA	W 10–7	10,000	
November 9	Villanova	Temple Stadium; Philadelphia, PA	W 28–0	20,000	
November 16	at Holy Cross	Fitton Field; Worcester, MA	T 6–6	5,000	
November 23	at Oklahoma	Owen Field; Norman, OK	L 6–9	7,000	
