= 1940 Buffalo Bulls football team =

American college football season

1940 Buffalo Bulls football
- Conference: Independent
- Record: 3–5
- Head coach: Jim Peele (5th season)
- Captain: Roger Perkins
- Home stadium: Rotary Field

1940 Eastern college football independents records
	Conf.			Overall
Team	W	L	T	W		L		T
No. 5 Boston College		–		11	–	0	–	0
Duquesne		–		7	–	1	–	0
No. 14 Penn		–		6	–	1	–	1
Penn State		–		6	–	1	–	1
No. 12 Fordham		–		7	–	2	–	0
No. 15 Cornell		–		6	–	2	–	0
La Salle		–		6	–	2	–	0
Princeton		–		5	–	2	–	1
Columbia		–		5	–	2	–	2
Brown		–		6	–	3	–	1
Bucknell		–		4	–	2	–	2
Boston University		–		5	–	3	–	0
Colgate		–		5	–	3	–	0
Hofstra		–		4	–	3	–	0
Harvard		–		3	–	2	–	3
Dartmouth		–		5	–	4	–	0
Temple		–		4	–	4	–	1
Tufts		–		4	–	4	–	0
Vermont		–		4	–	4	–	0
Villanova		–		4	–	5	–	0
Pittsburgh		–		3	–	4	–	1
Syracuse		–		3	–	4	–	1
Buffalo		–		3	–	5	–	0
Carnegie Tech		–		3	–	5	–	0
Manhattan		–		3	–	6	–	0
Providence		–		3	–	6	–	0
NYU		–		2	–	7	–	0
Yale		–		1	–	7	–	0
Army		–		1	–	7	–	1
CCNY		–		1	–	5	–	1
Massachusetts State		–		1	–	8	–	0
Rankings from AP Poll

The 1940 Buffalo Bulls football team was an American football team that represented the University of Buffalo as an independent during the 1940 college football season. In its fifth season under head coach Jim Peele, the team compiled a 3–5 record. The team played its home games at Rotary Field in Buffalo, New York.

Buffalo was ranked at No. 456 (out of 697 college football teams) in the final rankings under the Litkenhous Difference by Score system for 1940.

== Schedule ==
Date	Opponent	Site	Result	Source
September 28	at Susquehanna	Selinsgrove, PA	L 6–20	
October 5	Drexel	Rotary Field; Buffalo, NY	W 20–13	
October 12	at Williams	Weston Field; Williamstown, MA	L 0–27	
October 19	at Alfred	Alfred, NY	L 0–19	
October 26	at Connecticut	Gardner Dow Athletic Fields; Storrs, CT	W 7–6	
November 2	CCNY	Rotary Field; Buffalo, NY	W 7–6	
November 9	Hobart	Rotary Field; Buffalo, NY	L 7–19	
November 16	Wayne	Rotary Field; Buffalo, NY	L 0–6	
