= 1940 Yale Bulldogs football team =

American college football season

1940 Yale Bulldogs football
- Conference: Independent
- Record: 1–7
- Head coach: Ducky Pond (7th season)
- Captain: Harold B. Whiteman
- Home stadium: Yale Bowl

1940 Eastern college football independents records
	Conf.			Overall
Team	W	L	T	W		L		T
No. 5 Boston College		–		11	–	0	–	0
Duquesne		–		7	–	1	–	0
No. 14 Penn		–		6	–	1	–	1
Penn State		–		6	–	1	–	1
No. 12 Fordham		–		7	–	2	–	0
No. 15 Cornell		–		6	–	2	–	0
La Salle		–		6	–	2	–	0
Princeton		–		5	–	2	–	1
Columbia		–		5	–	2	–	2
Brown		–		6	–	3	–	1
Bucknell		–		4	–	2	–	2
Boston University		–		5	–	3	–	0
Colgate		–		5	–	3	–	0
Hofstra		–		4	–	3	–	0
Harvard		–		3	–	2	–	3
Dartmouth		–		5	–	4	–	0
Temple		–		4	–	4	–	1
Tufts		–		4	–	4	–	0
Vermont		–		4	–	4	–	0
Villanova		–		4	–	5	–	0
Pittsburgh		–		3	–	4	–	1
Syracuse		–		3	–	4	–	1
Buffalo		–		3	–	5	–	0
Carnegie Tech		–		3	–	5	–	0
Manhattan		–		3	–	6	–	0
Providence		–		3	–	6	–	0
NYU		–		2	–	7	–	0
Yale		–		1	–	7	–	0
Army		–		1	–	7	–	1
CCNY		–		1	–	5	–	1
Massachusetts State		–		1	–	8	–	0
Rankings from AP Poll

The 1940 Yale Bulldogs football team represented Yale University in the 1940 college football season. The Bulldogs were led by seventh-year head coach Ducky Pond, played their home games at the Yale Bowl and finished the season with a 1–7 record.

Yale was ranked at No. 110 (out of 697 college football teams) in the final rankings under the Litkenhous Difference by Score system for 1940.

== Schedule ==
Date	Opponent	Site	Result	Attendance	Source
October 5	Virginia	Yale Bowl; New Haven, CT	L 14–19	25,000	
October 12	at Penn	Franklin Field; Philadelphia, PA	L 7–50	50,000	
October 19	Dartmouth	Yale Bowl; New Haven, CT	W 13–7		
October 26	Navy	Yale Bowl; New Haven, CT	L 0–21		
November 2	Brown	Yale Bowl; New Haven, CT	L 2–6		
November 9	No. 1 Cornell	Yale Bowl; New Haven, CT	L 0–21	30,000	
November 16	at Princeton	Palmer Stadium; Princeton, NJ (rivalry)	L 7–10		
November 23	Harvard	Yale Bowl; New Haven, CT (rivalry)	L 0–28	47,000	
Rankings from AP Poll released prior to the game
