= 1940 Rhode Island State Rams football team =

American college football season

1940 Rhode Island State Rams football
- Conference: New England Conference
- Record: 5–3 (2–1 New England)
- Head coach: Frank Keaney (21st season)
- Home stadium: Meade Stadium

1940 New England Conference football standings
	Conf.					Overall
Team	W		L		T	W		L		T
New Hampshire $	2	–	0	–	0	5	–	3	–	0
Rhode Island State	2	–	1	–	0	5	–	3	–	0
Connecticut	1	–	2	–	0	4	–	4	–	0
Maine	1	–	2	–	0	1	–	6	–	0
Northeastern	0	–	1	–	0	2	–	6	–	0
$ – Conference champion

The 1940 Rhode Island Rams football team was an American football team that represented Rhode Island State College (later renamed the University of Rhode Island) as a member of the New England Conference during the 1940 college football season. In its 21st season under head coach Frank Keaney, the team compiled a 5–3 record (2–1 against conference opponents) and finished in second place in the conference.

Rhode Island was ranked at No. 310 (out of 697 college football teams) in the final rankings under the Litkenhous Difference by Score system for 1940.

The team played its home games at Meade Stadium in Kingston, Rhode Island.

== Schedule ==
Date	Opponent	Site	Result	Attendance	Source
September 21	Northeastern	Meade Stadium; Kingston, RI	W 10–0		
September 28	at Maine	Alumni Field; Orono, ME	L 0–7	5,000	
October 5	at Brown*	Brown Stadium; Providence, RI (rivalry)	L 17–20	14,000	
October 12	Lowell Textile*	Meade Stadium; Kingston, RI	W 48–0		
October 19	at Massachusetts State*	Alumni Field; Amherst, MA	W 9–3		
October 23	at Providence*	Cranston Stadium; Cranston, RI	L 0–25	7,000	
November 2	Worcester Tech^{†}*	Meade Stadium; Kingston, RI	W 18–0		
November 9	at Connecticut	Gardner Dow Athletic Fields; Storrs, CT (rivalry)	W 13–12	7,000	
*Non-conference game; ^{†}Homecoming
