= 1940 Villanova Wildcats football team =

American college football season

1940 Villanova Wildcats football
- Conference: Independent
- Record: 4–5
- Head coach: Clipper Smith (5th season)
- Captain: Michael Basca
- Home stadium: Shibe Park

1940 Eastern college football independents records
	Conf.			Overall
Team	W	L	T	W		L		T
No. 5 Boston College		–		11	–	0	–	0
Duquesne		–		7	–	1	–	0
No. 14 Penn		–		6	–	1	–	1
Penn State		–		6	–	1	–	1
No. 12 Fordham		–		7	–	2	–	0
No. 15 Cornell		–		6	–	2	–	0
La Salle		–		6	–	2	–	0
Princeton		–		5	–	2	–	1
Columbia		–		5	–	2	–	2
Brown		–		6	–	3	–	1
Bucknell		–		4	–	2	–	2
Boston University		–		5	–	3	–	0
Colgate		–		5	–	3	–	0
Hofstra		–		4	–	3	–	0
Harvard		–		3	–	2	–	3
Dartmouth		–		5	–	4	–	0
Temple		–		4	–	4	–	1
Tufts		–		4	–	4	–	0
Vermont		–		4	–	4	–	0
Villanova		–		4	–	5	–	0
Pittsburgh		–		3	–	4	–	1
Syracuse		–		3	–	4	–	1
Buffalo		–		3	–	5	–	0
Carnegie Tech		–		3	–	5	–	0
Manhattan		–		3	–	6	–	0
Providence		–		3	–	6	–	0
NYU		–		2	–	7	–	0
Yale		–		1	–	7	–	0
Army		–		1	–	7	–	1
CCNY		–		1	–	5	–	1
Massachusetts State		–		1	–	8	–	0
Rankings from AP Poll

The 1940 Villanova Wildcats football team represented the Villanova University during the 1940 college football season. The head coach was Clipper Smith, coaching his fifth season with the Wildcats. The team played their home games at Villanova Stadium in Villanova, Pennsylvania.

Villanova was ranked at No. 56 (out of 697 college football teams) in the final rankings under the Litkenhous Difference by Score system for 1940.

== Schedule ==
Date	Opponent	Site	Result	Attendance	Source
October 5	Pennsylvania Military	Shibe Park; Philadelphia, PA	W 53–14		
October 11	Florida	Shibe Park; Philadelphia, PA	W 28–0	22,000	
October 19	vs. Baylor	Alamo Stadium; San Antonio, TX	L 0–7	13,000	
October 27	Detroit	Shibe Park; Philadelphia, PA	L 0–10	30,251	
November 1	Kansas	Shibe Park; Philadelphia, PA	W 33–7	12,000	
November 9	at Temple	Temple Stadium; Philadelphia, PA	L 0–28	20,000	
November 16	at Manhattan	Polo Grounds; New York, NY	W 13–6	10,126	
November 23	Duquesne	Shibe Park; Philadelphia, PA	L 10–14	15,000	
December 7	at Auburn	Cramton Bowl; Montgomery, AL	L 10–13	6,500	
