= 1940 Harvard Crimson football team =

American college football season

1940 Harvard Crimson football
- Conference: Independent
- Record: 3–2–3
- Head coach: Dick Harlow (6th season)
- Home stadium: Harvard Stadium

1940 Eastern college football independents records
	Conf.			Overall
Team	W	L	T	W		L		T
No. 5 Boston College		–		11	–	0	–	0
Duquesne		–		7	–	1	–	0
No. 14 Penn		–		6	–	1	–	1
Penn State		–		6	–	1	–	1
No. 12 Fordham		–		7	–	2	–	0
No. 15 Cornell		–		6	–	2	–	0
La Salle		–		6	–	2	–	0
Princeton		–		5	–	2	–	1
Columbia		–		5	–	2	–	2
Brown		–		6	–	3	–	1
Bucknell		–		4	–	2	–	2
Boston University		–		5	–	3	–	0
Colgate		–		5	–	3	–	0
Hofstra		–		4	–	3	–	0
Harvard		–		3	–	2	–	3
Dartmouth		–		5	–	4	–	0
Temple		–		4	–	4	–	1
Tufts		–		4	–	4	–	0
Vermont		–		4	–	4	–	0
Villanova		–		4	–	5	–	0
Pittsburgh		–		3	–	4	–	1
Syracuse		–		3	–	4	–	1
Buffalo		–		3	–	5	–	0
Carnegie Tech		–		3	–	5	–	0
Manhattan		–		3	–	6	–	0
Providence		–		3	–	6	–	0
NYU		–		2	–	7	–	0
Yale		–		1	–	7	–	0
Army		–		1	–	7	–	1
CCNY		–		1	–	5	–	1
Massachusetts State		–		1	–	8	–	0
Rankings from AP Poll

The 1940 Harvard Crimson football team was an American football team that represented Harvard University as an independent during the 1940 college football season. In its sixth season under head coach Dick Harlow, the team compiled a 3–2–3 record and outscored opponents by a total of 77 to 49.

Harvard was ranked at No. 51 (out of 697 college football teams) in the final rankings under the Litkenhous Difference by Score system for 1940.

The team played its home games at Harvard Stadium in Boston.

== Schedule ==
Date	Opponent	Site	Result	Attendance	Source
October 5	Amherst	Harvard Stadium; Boston, MA	W 13–0	15,000	
October 12	Michigan	Harvard Stadium; Boston, MA	L 0–26	26,315	
October 19	Army	Harvard Stadium; Boston, MA	T 6–6	30,000	
October 26	Dartmouth	Harvard Stadium; Boston, MA (rivalry)	L 6–7	35,000	
November 2	Princeton	Harvard Stadium; Boston, MA (rivalry)	T 0–0	15,000	
November 9	at No. 15 Penn	Franklin Field; Philadelphia, PA (rivalry)	T 10–10	35,000	
November 16	Brown	Harvard Stadium; Boston, MA	W 14–0		
November 23	at Yale	Yale Bowl; New Haven, CT (rivalry)	W 28–0	47,000	
Rankings from AP Poll released prior to the game
