= 1940 Boston University Terriers football team =

American college football season

1940 Boston University Terriers football
- Conference: Independent
- Record: 5–3
- Head coach: Pat Hanley (7th season)
- Home stadium: Nickerson Field

1940 Eastern college football independents records
	Conf.			Overall
Team	W	L	T	W		L		T
No. 5 Boston College		–		11	–	0	–	0
Duquesne		–		7	–	1	–	0
No. 14 Penn		–		6	–	1	–	1
Penn State		–		6	–	1	–	1
No. 12 Fordham		–		7	–	2	–	0
No. 15 Cornell		–		6	–	2	–	0
La Salle		–		6	–	2	–	0
Princeton		–		5	–	2	–	1
Columbia		–		5	–	2	–	2
Brown		–		6	–	3	–	1
Bucknell		–		4	–	2	–	2
Boston University		–		5	–	3	–	0
Colgate		–		5	–	3	–	0
Hofstra		–		4	–	3	–	0
Harvard		–		3	–	2	–	3
Dartmouth		–		5	–	4	–	0
Temple		–		4	–	4	–	1
Tufts		–		4	–	4	–	0
Vermont		–		4	–	4	–	0
Villanova		–		4	–	5	–	0
Pittsburgh		–		3	–	4	–	1
Syracuse		–		3	–	4	–	1
Buffalo		–		3	–	5	–	0
Carnegie Tech		–		3	–	5	–	0
Manhattan		–		3	–	6	–	0
Providence		–		3	–	6	–	0
NYU		–		2	–	7	–	0
Yale		–		1	–	7	–	0
Army		–		1	–	7	–	1
CCNY		–		1	–	5	–	1
Massachusetts State		–		1	–	8	–	0
Rankings from AP Poll

The 1940 Boston University Terriers football team was an American football team that represented Boston University as an independent during the 1940 college football season. In its seventh season under head coach Pat Hanley, the team compiled a 5–3 record and outscored opponents by a total of 160 to 73.

Boston University was ranked at No. 88 (out of 697 college football teams) in the final rankings under the Litkenhous Difference by Score system for 1940.

== Schedule ==
Date	Time	Opponent	Site	Result	Attendance	Source
September 28		Norwich	Nickerson Field; Weston, MA	W 38–7		
October 5		Upsala	Nickerson Field; Weston, MA	W 15–6		
October 11		at Manhattan	Polo Grounds; New York, NY	L 6–20	9,233	
October 19		Cincinnati	Nickerson Field; Weston, MA	W 14–0		
November 2	2:00 p.m.	at Western Reserve	League Park; Cleveland, OH	L 0–19	3,500	
November 9		vs. No. 8 Boston College	Fenway Park; Boston, MA (rivalry)	L 0–21	20,000	
November 16		Springfield	Nickerson Field; Weston, MA	W 50–0		
November 23		Western Maryland	Nickerson Field; Weston, MA	W 37–0		
Rankings from AP Poll released prior to the game; All times are in Eastern time
