= 1940 Lafayette Leopards football team =

American football club

1940 Lafayette Leopards football

Middle Three champion
- Conference: Middle Three Conference

Ranking
- AP: No. 19
- Record: 9–0 (2–0 Middle Three)
- Head coach: Edward Mylin (4th season)
- Captain: George Moyer
- Home stadium: Fisher Field

1940 Middle Three Conference football standings
	Conf.					Overall
Team	W		L		T	W		L		T
No. 19 Lafayette $	2	–	0	–	0	9	–	0	–	0
Rutgers	1	–	1	–	0	5	–	3	–	0
Lehigh	0	–	2	–	0	2	–	7	–	0
$ – Conference champion; Rankings from AP Poll

The 1940 Lafayette Leopards football team was an American football team that represented Lafayette College in the Middle Three Conference during the 1940 college football season. In its fourth season under head coach Edward Mylin, the team compiled a 9–0 record and outscored opponents by a total of 237 to 33. The team was ranked No. 19 in the final AP poll.

Lafayette led the country in both rushing offense (306.4 yards per game) and total offense (368.2 yards per game). They tallied 2,758 rushing yards, 556 passing yards, and 3,314 yards of total offense.

Halfback George Moyer was the team captain. Tackle Bill Collins was selected by the Associated Press (AP) as a second-team player on the 1940 All-Eastern football team. Six Lafayette players received first-team honors from the conference coaches on the All-Middle Three team: halfbacks George "Sammy" Moyer and Walter Zirinsky; center Walter Wermuth; end John Svenson; tackle Bill Collins; and guard William Kresge.

The team played home games at Fisher Field in Easton, Pennsylvania.

== Schedule ==
Date	Opponent	Rank	Site	Result	Attendance	Source
September 28	Ursinus*		Fisher Field; Easton, PA	W 20–0		
October 5	at NYU*		Ohio Field; New York, NY	W 9–7	12,000	
October 12	at Muhlenberg*		Allentown, PA	W 26–7	5,000	
October 19	Gettysburg*		Fisher Field; Easton, PA	W 45–6		
October 26	at Army*		Michie Stadium; West Point, NY	W 19–0	20,000	
November 2	Washington & Jefferson*		Fisher Field; Easton, PA	W 25–0		
November 9	at Rutgers	No. 18	Rutgers Stadium; Piscataway, NJ	W 7–6	19,000	
November 16	Western Maryland*		Fisher Field; Easton, PA	W 40–7		
November 23	Lehigh		Fisher Field; Easton, PA (rivalry)	W 46–0	15,000	
*Non-conference game; Rankings from AP Poll released prior to the game

== Rankings ==
Ranking movements Legend: ██ Increase in ranking ██ Decrease in ranking — = Not ranked т = Tied with team above or below
	Week							
Poll	1	2	3	4	5	6	7	Final
AP	—	—	—	18	—	—	18т	19
