= 1940 Penn State Nittany Lions football team =

American college football season

1940 Penn State Nittany Lions football
- Conference: Independent
- Record: 6–1–1
- Head coach: Bob Higgins (11th season)
- Captain: Leon Gajecki
- Home stadium: New Beaver Field

1940 Eastern college football independents records
	Conf.			Overall
Team	W	L	T	W		L		T
No. 5 Boston College		–		11	–	0	–	0
Duquesne		–		7	–	1	–	0
No. 14 Penn		–		6	–	1	–	1
Penn State		–		6	–	1	–	1
No. 12 Fordham		–		7	–	2	–	0
No. 15 Cornell		–		6	–	2	–	0
La Salle		–		6	–	2	–	0
Princeton		–		5	–	2	–	1
Columbia		–		5	–	2	–	2
Brown		–		6	–	3	–	1
Bucknell		–		4	–	2	–	2
Boston University		–		5	–	3	–	0
Colgate		–		5	–	3	–	0
Hofstra		–		4	–	3	–	0
Harvard		–		3	–	2	–	3
Dartmouth		–		5	–	4	–	0
Temple		–		4	–	4	–	1
Tufts		–		4	–	4	–	0
Vermont		–		4	–	4	–	0
Villanova		–		4	–	5	–	0
Pittsburgh		–		3	–	4	–	1
Syracuse		–		3	–	4	–	1
Buffalo		–		3	–	5	–	0
Carnegie Tech		–		3	–	5	–	0
Manhattan		–		3	–	6	–	0
Providence		–		3	–	6	–	0
NYU		–		2	–	7	–	0
Yale		–		1	–	7	–	0
Army		–		1	–	7	–	1
CCNY		–		1	–	5	–	1
Massachusetts State		–		1	–	8	–	0
Rankings from AP Poll

The 1940 Penn State Nittany Lions football team represented the Pennsylvania State College as an independent during the 1940 college football season. The team was coached by Bob Higgins.

Penn State was ranked at No. 52 (out of 697 college football teams) in the final rankings under the Litkenhous Difference by Score system for 1940.

The team played its home games in New Beaver Field in State College, Pennsylvania.

== Schedule ==
Date	Opponent	Rank	Site	Result	Attendance	Source
October 5	Bucknell		New Beaver Field; State College, PA	W 9–0	12,091	
October 12	West Virginia^{†}		New Beaver Field; State College, PA (rivalry)	W 17–13	10,574–13,000	
October 19	at Lehigh		Taylor Stadium; Bethlehem, PA	W 34–0	3,000	
October 26	at Temple		Temple Stadium; Philadelphia, PA	W 18–0	25,000	
November 2	South Carolina	No. 18	New Beaver Field; State College, PA	W 12–0	9,346	
November 9	at Syracuse	No. 16	Archbold Stadium; Syracuse, NY (rivalry)	T 13–13	15,000	
November 16	NYU	No. 20	New Beaver Field; State College, PA	W 25–0	9,449	
November 23	at Pittsburgh	No. 20	Pitt Stadium; Pittsburgh, PA (rivalry)	L 7–20	30,083	
^{†}Homecoming; Rankings from AP Poll released prior to the game

== Rankings ==
Ranking movements Legend: ██ Increase in ranking ██ Decrease in ranking — = Not ranked т = Tied with team above or below
	Week							
Poll	1	2	3	4	5	6	7	Final
AP	—	—	18т	16	20т	20т	—	—
