= 1940 Syracuse Orangemen football team =

American college football season

1940 Syracuse Orangemen football
- Conference: Independent
- Record: 3–4–1
- Head coach: Ossie Solem (4th season)
- Captain: Richard Banger
- Home stadium: Archbold Stadium

1940 Eastern college football independents records
	Conf.			Overall
Team	W	L	T	W		L		T
No. 5 Boston College		–		11	–	0	–	0
Duquesne		–		7	–	1	–	0
No. 14 Penn		–		6	–	1	–	1
Penn State		–		6	–	1	–	1
No. 12 Fordham		–		7	–	2	–	0
No. 15 Cornell		–		6	–	2	–	0
La Salle		–		6	–	2	–	0
Princeton		–		5	–	2	–	1
Columbia		–		5	–	2	–	2
Brown		–		6	–	3	–	1
Bucknell		–		4	–	2	–	2
Boston University		–		5	–	3	–	0
Colgate		–		5	–	3	–	0
Hofstra		–		4	–	3	–	0
Harvard		–		3	–	2	–	3
Dartmouth		–		5	–	4	–	0
Temple		–		4	–	4	–	1
Tufts		–		4	–	4	–	0
Vermont		–		4	–	4	–	0
Villanova		–		4	–	5	–	0
Pittsburgh		–		3	–	4	–	1
Syracuse		–		3	–	4	–	1
Buffalo		–		3	–	5	–	0
Carnegie Tech		–		3	–	5	–	0
Manhattan		–		3	–	6	–	0
Providence		–		3	–	6	–	0
NYU		–		2	–	7	–	0
Yale		–		1	–	7	–	0
Army		–		1	–	7	–	1
CCNY		–		1	–	5	–	1
Massachusetts State		–		1	–	8	–	0
Rankings from AP Poll

The 1940 Syracuse Orangemen football team represented Syracuse University as an independent during the 1940 college football season. The Orangemen were led by fourth-year head coach Ossie Solem.

Syracuse was ranked at No. 65 (out of 697 college football teams) in the final rankings under the Litkenhous Difference by Score system for 1940.

The team played its home games at Archbold Stadium in Syracuse, New York.

== Schedule ==
Date	Opponent	Site	Result	Attendance	Source
September 27	Clarkson	Archbold Stadium; Syracuse, NY	W 33–0	15,000	
October 5	Northwestern	Archbold Stadium; Syracuse, NY	L 0–40	22,000	
October 12	at NYU	Yankee Stadium; Bronx, NY	W 47–13	8,000	
October 19	at No. 1 Cornell	Schoellkopf Field; Ithaca, NY	L 6–33	18,000	
October 26	at No. 20 Columbia	Baker Field; New York, NY	W 3–0	22,000	
November 2	No. 10 Georgetown	Archbold Stadium; Syracuse, NY	L 6–28	17,000	
November 9	No. 16 Penn State	Archbold Stadium; Syracuse, NY (rivalry)	T 13–13	15,000	
November 16	Colgate	Archbold Stadium; Syracuse, NY (rivalry)	L 6–7	25,000	
Rankings from AP Poll released prior to the game
