= 1940 Duquesne Dukes football team =

American college football season

1940 Duquesne Dukes football
- Conference: Independent
- Record: 7–1
- Head coach: Aldo Donelli (2nd season)
- Home stadium: Forbes Field

1940 Eastern college football independents records
	Conf.			Overall
Team	W	L	T	W		L		T
No. 5 Boston College		–		11	–	0	–	0
Duquesne		–		7	–	1	–	0
No. 14 Penn		–		6	–	1	–	1
Penn State		–		6	–	1	–	1
No. 12 Fordham		–		7	–	2	–	0
No. 15 Cornell		–		6	–	2	–	0
La Salle		–		6	–	2	–	0
Princeton		–		5	–	2	–	1
Columbia		–		5	–	2	–	2
Brown		–		6	–	3	–	1
Bucknell		–		4	–	2	–	2
Boston University		–		5	–	3	–	0
Colgate		–		5	–	3	–	0
Hofstra		–		4	–	3	–	0
Harvard		–		3	–	2	–	3
Dartmouth		–		5	–	4	–	0
Temple		–		4	–	4	–	1
Tufts		–		4	–	4	–	0
Vermont		–		4	–	4	–	0
Villanova		–		4	–	5	–	0
Pittsburgh		–		3	–	4	–	1
Syracuse		–		3	–	4	–	1
Buffalo		–		3	–	5	–	0
Carnegie Tech		–		3	–	5	–	0
Manhattan		–		3	–	6	–	0
Providence		–		3	–	6	–	0
NYU		–		2	–	7	–	0
Yale		–		1	–	7	–	0
Army		–		1	–	7	–	1
CCNY		–		1	–	5	–	1
Massachusetts State		–		1	–	8	–	0
Rankings from AP Poll

The 1940 Duquesne Dukes football team was an American football team that represented Duquesne University as an independent during the 1940 college football season. In its second season under head coach Aldo Donelli, Duquesne compiled a 7–1 record and outscored opponents by a total of 118 to 54.

Duquesne was ranked at No. 48 (out of 697 college football teams) in the final rankings under the Litkenhous Difference by Score system for 1940.

== Schedule ==
Date	Opponent	Site	Result	Attendance	Source
September 27	Waynesburg	Forbes Field; Pittsburgh, PA	W 26–0		
October 11	South Carolina	Forbes Field; Pittsburgh, PA	W 27–21	8,700	
October 19	at No. 13 Ole Miss	Hemingway Stadium; Oxford, MS	L 6–14	10,000	
October 25	Manhattan	Forbes Field; Pittsburgh, PA	W 10–6	12,803	
November 2	Marquette	Forbes Field; Pittsburgh, PA	W 14–0	14,218	
November 10	at Saint Mary's	Kezar Stadium; San Francisco, CA	W 7–6	12,000	
November 23	at Villanova	Shibe Park; Philadelphia, PA	W 14–0	15,000	
November 30	at Carnegie Tech	Pitt Stadium; Pittsburgh, PA	W 14–10	19,907	
Rankings from AP Poll released prior to the game
