= 1940 Columbia Lions football team =

American college football season

1940 Columbia Lions football
- Conference: Independent
- Record: 5–2–2
- Head coach: Lou Little (11th season)
- Home stadium: Baker Field

1940 Eastern college football independents records
	Conf.			Overall
Team	W	L	T	W		L		T
No. 5 Boston College		–		11	–	0	–	0
Duquesne		–		7	–	1	–	0
No. 14 Penn		–		6	–	1	–	1
Penn State		–		6	–	1	–	1
No. 12 Fordham		–		7	–	2	–	0
No. 15 Cornell		–		6	–	2	–	0
La Salle		–		6	–	2	–	0
Princeton		–		5	–	2	–	1
Columbia		–		5	–	2	–	2
Brown		–		6	–	3	–	1
Bucknell		–		4	–	2	–	2
Boston University		–		5	–	3	–	0
Colgate		–		5	–	3	–	0
Hofstra		–		4	–	3	–	0
Harvard		–		3	–	2	–	3
Dartmouth		–		5	–	4	–	0
Temple		–		4	–	4	–	1
Tufts		–		4	–	4	–	0
Vermont		–		4	–	4	–	0
Villanova		–		4	–	5	–	0
Pittsburgh		–		3	–	4	–	1
Syracuse		–		3	–	4	–	1
Buffalo		–		3	–	5	–	0
Carnegie Tech		–		3	–	5	–	0
Manhattan		–		3	–	6	–	0
Providence		–		3	–	6	–	0
NYU		–		2	–	7	–	0
Yale		–		1	–	7	–	0
Army		–		1	–	7	–	1
CCNY		–		1	–	5	–	1
Massachusetts State		–		1	–	8	–	0
Rankings from AP Poll

The 1940 Columbia Lions football team was an American football team that represented Columbia University during the 1945 college football season. In their 11th season under head coach Lou Little, the team compiled a 5–2–2 record and outscored all opponents by a combined total of 81 to 72.

Columbia was ranked at No. 61 (out of 697 college football teams) in the final rankings under the Litkenhous Difference by Score system for 1940.

== Schedule ==
Date	Opponent	Rank	Site	Result	Attendance	Source
October 5	Maine		Baker Field; New York, NY	W 15–0		
October 12	at Dartmouth		Memorial Field; Hanover, NH	W 20–6	10,000	
October 19	Georgia		Baker Field; New York, NY	W 19–13	25,000	
October 26	Syracuse	No. 20	Baker Field; New York, NY	L 0–3	22,000	
November 2	at No. 1 Cornell		Schoellkopf Field; Ithaca, NY (rivalry)	L 0–27	13,500	
November 9	Wisconsin		Baker Field; New York, NY	W 7–6	20,000	
November 16	Navy		Baker Field; New York, NY	T 0–0	30,000	
November 23	Colgate		Baker Field; New York, NY	W 20–17	24,000	
November 28	at Brown		Brown Stadium; Providence, RI	L 0–6	15,000	
Rankings from AP Poll released prior to the game

== Rankings ==
Ranking movements Legend: ██ Increase in ranking ██ Decrease in ranking — = Not ranked
	Week							
Poll	1	2	3	4	5	6	7	Final
AP	—	20	—	—	—	—	—	—
