= 1940 Dartmouth Indians football team =

American college football season

1940 Dartmouth Indians football
- Conference: Independent
- Record: 5–4
- Head coach: Earl Blaik (7th season)
- Captain: Louis Young
- Home stadium: Memorial Field

1940 Eastern college football independents records
	Conf.			Overall
Team	W	L	T	W		L		T
No. 5 Boston College		–		11	–	0	–	0
Duquesne		–		7	–	1	–	0
No. 14 Penn		–		6	–	1	–	1
Penn State		–		6	–	1	–	1
No. 12 Fordham		–		7	–	2	–	0
No. 15 Cornell		–		6	–	2	–	0
La Salle		–		6	–	2	–	0
Princeton		–		5	–	2	–	1
Columbia		–		5	–	2	–	2
Brown		–		6	–	3	–	1
Bucknell		–		4	–	2	–	2
Boston University		–		5	–	3	–	0
Colgate		–		5	–	3	–	0
Hofstra		–		4	–	3	–	0
Harvard		–		3	–	2	–	3
Dartmouth		–		5	–	4	–	0
Temple		–		4	–	4	–	1
Tufts		–		4	–	4	–	0
Vermont		–		4	–	4	–	0
Villanova		–		4	–	5	–	0
Pittsburgh		–		3	–	4	–	1
Syracuse		–		3	–	4	–	1
Buffalo		–		3	–	5	–	0
Carnegie Tech		–		3	–	5	–	0
Manhattan		–		3	–	6	–	0
Providence		–		3	–	6	–	0
NYU		–		2	–	7	–	0
Yale		–		1	–	7	–	0
Army		–		1	–	7	–	1
CCNY		–		1	–	5	–	1
Massachusetts State		–		1	–	8	–	0
Rankings from AP Poll

The 1940 Dartmouth Indians football team was an American football team that represented Dartmouth College as an independent during the 1940 college football season. In their seventh and final season under head coach Earl Blaik, the Indians compiled a 5–4 record. Louis Young was the team captain.

George Wolfe was the team's leading scorer, with 48 points, from eight touchdowns.

Dartmouth was ranked at No. 72 (out of 697 college football teams) in the final rankings under the Litkenhous Difference by Score system for 1940.

Dartmouth played its home games at Memorial Field on the college campus in Hanover, New Hampshire.

== Cornell game controversy ==
Cornell scored a touchdown in the last few seconds of the game, resulting in a 7–3 win for Cornell being officially recorded. However, observers felt that an illegal fifth down had occurred, and therefore the touchdown was invalid. After developing and reviewing filmed footage of the game, the referee agreed. Cornell coach Carl Snavely agreed to give up the win, and thus the official score was revised to 3–0 in favor of Dartmouth. The loss broke Cornell's 18-game winning streak. As of 2024, it is believed to be the "only collegiate sporting contest to be decided off the field after its completion."

== Schedule ==
Date	Opponent	Site	Result	Attendance	Source
September 28	St. Lawrence	Memorial Field; Hanover, NH	W 36–0		
October 5	Franklin & Marshall	Memorial Field; Hanover, NH	L 21–23	8,000	
October 12	Columbia	Memorial Field; Hanover, NH	L 6–20	10,000	
October 19	at Yale	Yale Bowl; New Haven, CT	L 7–13	35,000	
October 26	at Harvard	Harvard Stadium; Boston, MA (rivalry)	W 7–6	35,000	
November 2	Sewanee	Memorial Field; Hanover, NH	W 26–0		
November 9	at Princeton	Palmer Stadium; Princeton, NJ	L 9–14	30,000	
November 16	Cornell	Memorial Field; Hanover, NH (Fifth Down Game) (rivalry)	W 3–0	10,000	
November 23	at Brown	Brown Stadium; Providence, RI	W 20–6	15,000	
