= 1940 Boston College Eagles football team =

American college football season

1940 Boston College Eagles football

National champion (self-claimed) Eastern champion Sugar Bowl champion

Sugar Bowl, W 19–13 vs. Tennessee
- Conference: Independent

Ranking
- AP: No. 5
- Record: 11–0
- Head coach: Frank Leahy (2nd season)
- Captain: Henry Toczylowski
- Home stadium: Alumni Field; Fenway Park

1940 Eastern college football independents records
	Conf.			Overall
Team	W	L	T	W		L		T
No. 5 Boston College		–		11	–	0	–	0
Duquesne		–		7	–	1	–	0
No. 14 Penn		–		6	–	1	–	1
Penn State		–		6	–	1	–	1
No. 12 Fordham		–		7	–	2	–	0
No. 15 Cornell		–		6	–	2	–	0
La Salle		–		6	–	2	–	0
Princeton		–		5	–	2	–	1
Columbia		–		5	–	2	–	2
Brown		–		6	–	3	–	1
Bucknell		–		4	–	2	–	2
Boston University		–		5	–	3	–	0
Colgate		–		5	–	3	–	0
Hofstra		–		4	–	3	–	0
Harvard		–		3	–	2	–	3
Dartmouth		–		5	–	4	–	0
Temple		–		4	–	4	–	1
Tufts		–		4	–	4	–	0
Vermont		–		4	–	4	–	0
Villanova		–		4	–	5	–	0
Pittsburgh		–		3	–	4	–	1
Syracuse		–		3	–	4	–	1
Buffalo		–		3	–	5	–	0
Carnegie Tech		–		3	–	5	–	0
Manhattan		–		3	–	6	–	0
Providence		–		3	–	6	–	0
NYU		–		2	–	7	–	0
Yale		–		1	–	7	–	0
Army		–		1	–	7	–	1
CCNY		–		1	–	5	–	1
Massachusetts State		–		1	–	8	–	0
Rankings from AP Poll

The 1940 Boston College Eagles football team represented Boston College as an independent during the 1940 college football season. The team was led by head coach Frank Leahy in his second year, and played their home games at Fenway Park in Boston and Alumni Field in Chestnut Hill, Massachusetts. The "team of destiny" finished with an overall record of 11–0, including six shutouts and a win in the Sugar Bowl.

== Schedule ==
Date	Opponent	Rank	Site	Result	Attendance	Source
September 21	Centre		Alumni Field; Chestnut Hill, MA	W 40–0	19,000	
September 28	at Tulane		Tulane Stadium; New Orleans, LA	W 27–7	42,000	
October 12	Temple		Fenway Park; Boston, MA	W 33–20	28,000	
October 19	Idaho	No. 8	Fenway Park; Boston, MA	W 60–0	8,000	
October 26	Saint Anselm	No. 10	Alumni Field; Chestnut Hill, MA	W 55–0	17,000	
November 2	Manhattan	No. 9	Alumni Field; Chestnut Hill, MA	W 25–0	12,000	
November 9	vs. Boston University	No. 8	Fenway Park; Boston, MA (rivalry)	W 21–0	20,000	
November 16	No. 9 Georgetown	No. 8	Fenway Park; Boston, MA	W 19–18	43,000	
November 23	Auburn	No. 4	Fenway Park; Boston, MA	W 33–7	30,000	
November 30	vs. Holy Cross	No. 4	Fenway Park; Boston, MA (rivalry)	W 7–0	38,000	
January 1, 1941	vs. No. 4 Tennessee	No. 5	Tulane Stadium; New Orleans, LA (Sugar Bowl)	W 19–13	73,181	
Rankings from AP Poll released prior to the game; Source:

== Rankings ==
Ranking movements Legend: ██ Increase in ranking ██ Decrease in ranking ( ) = First-place votes
	Week							
Poll	1	2	3	4	5	6	7	Final
AP	8	10	9 (2)	8 (2)	8	4 (12)	4 (15)	5 (7)

== Season summary ==
The BC Eagles won all ten games in the regular season, were the highest-scoring team in the country, and won the Lambert Trophy, awarded to the "Eastern champion". Scoring leaders during the regular season were Frank Maznicki (80 points), Mike Holovak (67 points), and Lou Montgomery (36 points).

From 1936 to 1964, the final AP Poll ranking college football teams was taken at the end of the regular season, before the postseason bowl games. The final 1940 rankings were published on December 2, and listed undefeated Minnesota (8–0) first. Minnesota had secured a thrilling home win by an extra point, 7–6, over Michigan in early November—Michigan finished the regular season with a 7–1 record and was ranked third. Stanford (10–0) was ranked second, Tennessee (10–0) fourth, and Boston College (10–0) was fifth.

=== Postseason ===
Boston College played in the Sugar Bowl on New Year's Day and defeated Tennessee, champion of the Southeastern Conference (SEC), by a score of 19–13. The Eagles played without Montgomery, a halfback, due to racial policies of the era. Tennessee had outscored its regular season opponents 319–26, soundly beating such opponents as Alabama, Florida, LSU, Kentucky, Virginia, and Duke.

Neither Minnesota nor Michigan played in a postseason bowl game, and Stanford defeated No. 7 Nebraska in the Rose Bowl by a score of 21–13. Despite where the AP rated teams at the end of the regular season, BC's postseason win over Tennessee was widely deemed the best win of any team in the 1940 season.

=== Aftermath ===
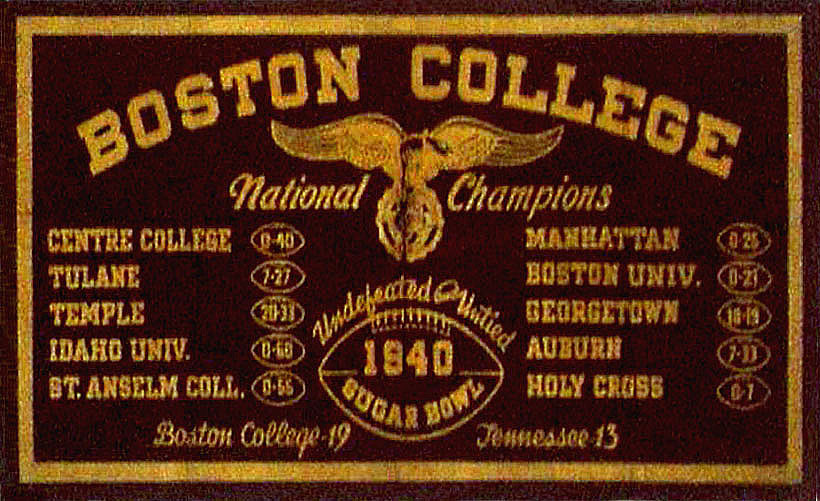
1940 banner

For this era, when a limited number of bowl games were played and no polling was conducted after postseason contests, there are often competing claims for the national championship of a given season.

With its undefeated season and bowl win, the BC Eagles were widely acclaimed as national champions. While there is a banner on the BC campus that lists the score of each game the Eagles played, along with "National Champions" wording, BC's football media guide only makes passing mention of a "claim to the national championship with a 19-13 victory over Tennessee in the Sugar Bowl."

The NCAA lists only Minnesota (ranked first in the final AP Poll of early December) as the national champion for 1940, and does not credit Boston College with any national championships in football. Several other selectors list Stanford as the 1940 champion and one lists Tennessee.
