= 1940 Princeton Tigers football team =

American college football season

1940 Princeton Tigers football
- Conference: Independent
- Record: 5–2–1
- Head coach: Tad Wieman (3rd season)
- Captain: Howie Stanley
- Home stadium: Palmer Stadium

1940 Eastern college football independents records
	Conf.			Overall
Team	W	L	T	W		L		T
No. 5 Boston College		–		11	–	0	–	0
Duquesne		–		7	–	1	–	0
No. 14 Penn		–		6	–	1	–	1
Penn State		–		6	–	1	–	1
No. 12 Fordham		–		7	–	2	–	0
No. 15 Cornell		–		6	–	2	–	0
La Salle		–		6	–	2	–	0
Princeton		–		5	–	2	–	1
Columbia		–		5	–	2	–	2
Brown		–		6	–	3	–	1
Bucknell		–		4	–	2	–	2
Boston University		–		5	–	3	–	0
Colgate		–		5	–	3	–	0
Hofstra		–		4	–	3	–	0
Harvard		–		3	–	2	–	3
Dartmouth		–		5	–	4	–	0
Temple		–		4	–	4	–	1
Tufts		–		4	–	4	–	0
Vermont		–		4	–	4	–	0
Villanova		–		4	–	5	–	0
Pittsburgh		–		3	–	4	–	1
Syracuse		–		3	–	4	–	1
Buffalo		–		3	–	5	–	0
Carnegie Tech		–		3	–	5	–	0
Manhattan		–		3	–	6	–	0
Providence		–		3	–	6	–	0
NYU		–		2	–	7	–	0
Yale		–		1	–	7	–	0
Army		–		1	–	7	–	1
CCNY		–		1	–	5	–	1
Massachusetts State		–		1	–	8	–	0
Rankings from AP Poll

The 1940 Princeton Tigers football team was an American football team that represented Princeton University as an independent during the 1940 college football season. In its third season under head coach Tad Wieman, the team compiled a 5–2–1 record and outscored opponents by a total of 119 to 112.

Howie Stanley was Princeton's team captain. He also received the John Prentiss Poe Cup, the team's highest award. Halfback Dave Allerdice was selected by the Associated Press as a second-team player on the 1940 All-Eastern college football team, and by the Central Press Association as a third-team player on the All-America team.

Princeton was ranked at No. 58 (out of 697 college football teams) in the final rankings under the Litkenhous Difference by Score system for 1940.

Princeton played its 1940 home games at Palmer Stadium in Princeton, New Jersey.

== Schedule ==
Date	Opponent	Site	Result	Attendance	Source
October 5	Vanderbilt	Palmer Stadium; Princeton, NJ	W 7–6	16,000	
October 12	Navy	Palmer Stadium; Princeton, NJ	L 6–12	40,000	
October 19	at No. 9 Penn	Franklin Field; Philadelphia, PA (rivalry)	L 28–46	55,000	
October 26	Rutgers	Palmer Stadium; Princeton, NJ (rivalry)	W 28–13	40,000	
November 2	at Harvard	Harvard Stadium; Boston, MA (rivalry)	T 0–0	15,000	
November 9	Dartmouth	Palmer Stadium; Princeton, NJ	W 14–9	30,000	
November 16	Yale	Palmer Stadium; Princeton, NJ (rivalry)	W 10–7	45,000	
November 23	Army	Palmer Stadium; Princeton, NJ	W 26–19	26,000	
Rankings from AP Poll released prior to the game

== Roster ==
- Donald B. Allen, Class of 1943
- David W. Allerdice, Class of 1941
- Baker A. Bradenbaugh, Class of 1941
- Paul Busse, Class of 1942
- Howard M. Clark, Class of 1942
- Dave K. Headley, Class of 1943
- James J. Howley, Class of 1942
- Thomas B. Irwin, Class of 1942
- Robert K. Jackson, Class of 1941
- Gregory T. Kinniry, Class of 1944
- James R. MacColl III, Class of 1941
- Charles R. McAllister, Class of 1942
- William L. Morris Jr., Class of 1943
- Lawrence P. Naylor III, Class of 1941
- Robert I. Perina, Class of 1943
- Robert L. Peters Jr., Class of 1942
- William D. Pettit, Class of 1941
- C. Leslie Rice Jr., Class of 1941
- Charles L. Ransom, Class of 1942
- Charles H. Robinson, Class of 1941
- Edward C. Rose Jr., Class of 1942
- Robert P. Sandbach, Class of 1943
- Richard R. Schmon, Class of 1943
- William S. Shee, Class of 1941
- Howard J. Stanley, Class of 1941
- William F. Stebbins, Class of 1941
- H. James Stokes Jr., Class of 1941
- Robert M. Thomas, Class of 1942
- Bruce P. Wilson, Class of 1942
- S.A. Young Jr., Class of 1941
