= 1940 Fordham Rams football team =

American college football season

1940 Fordham Rams football
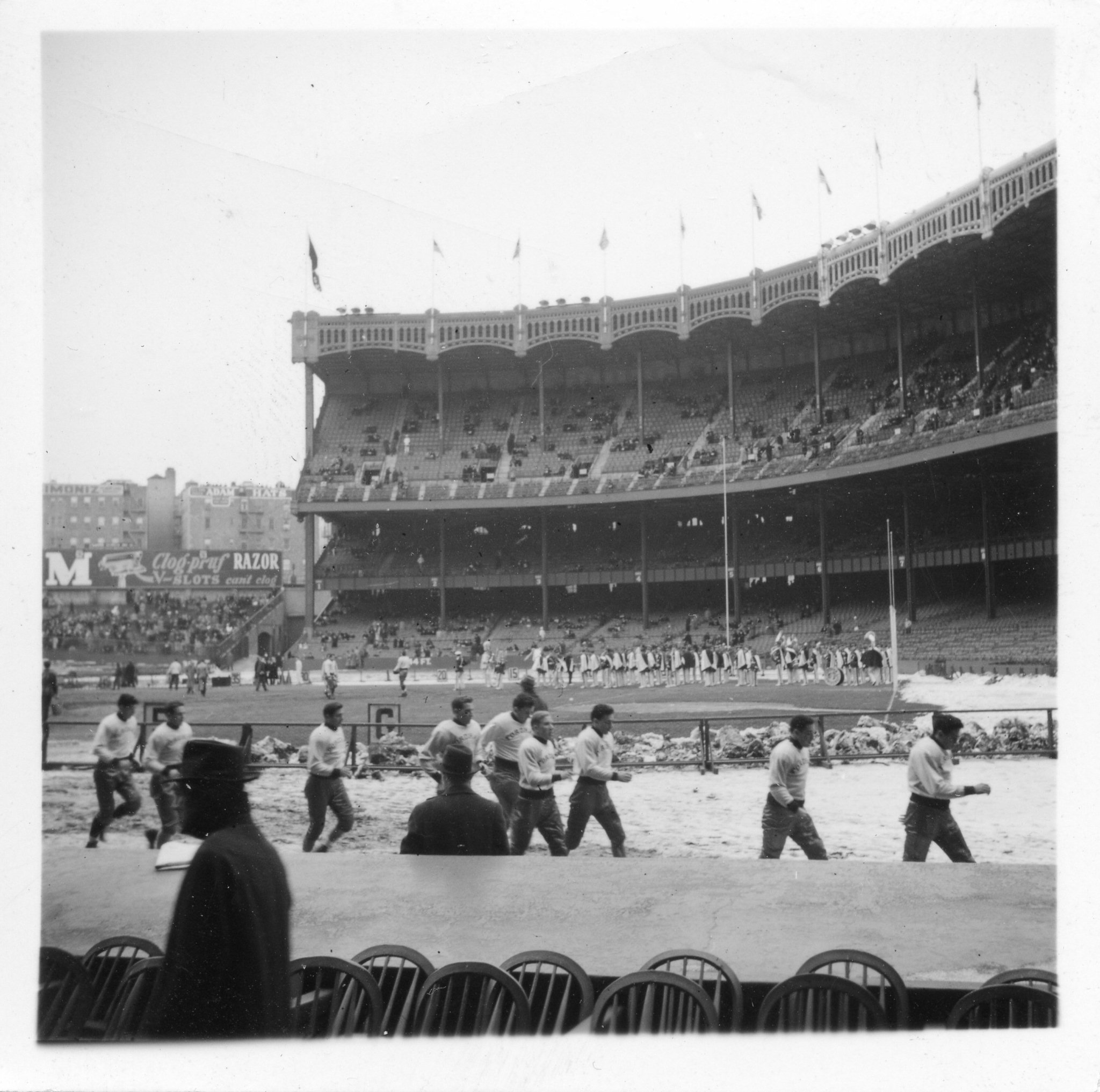
- Fordham prepares to take on NYU in front of 35,000 at Yankee Stadium

Cotton Bowl, L 12–13 vs. Texas A&M
- Conference: Independent

Ranking
- AP: No. 12
- Record: 7–2
- Head coach: Jim Crowley (8th season)
- Home stadium: Polo Grounds

1940 Eastern college football independents records
	Conf.			Overall
Team	W	L	T	W		L		T
No. 5 Boston College		–		11	–	0	–	0
Duquesne		–		7	–	1	–	0
No. 14 Penn		–		6	–	1	–	1
Penn State		–		6	–	1	–	1
No. 12 Fordham		–		7	–	2	–	0
No. 15 Cornell		–		6	–	2	–	0
La Salle		–		6	–	2	–	0
Princeton		–		5	–	2	–	1
Columbia		–		5	–	2	–	2
Brown		–		6	–	3	–	1
Bucknell		–		4	–	2	–	2
Boston University		–		5	–	3	–	0
Colgate		–		5	–	3	–	0
Hofstra		–		4	–	3	–	0
Harvard		–		3	–	2	–	3
Dartmouth		–		5	–	4	–	0
Temple		–		4	–	4	–	1
Tufts		–		4	–	4	–	0
Vermont		–		4	–	4	–	0
Villanova		–		4	–	5	–	0
Pittsburgh		–		3	–	4	–	1
Syracuse		–		3	–	4	–	1
Buffalo		–		3	–	5	–	0
Carnegie Tech		–		3	–	5	–	0
Manhattan		–		3	–	6	–	0
Providence		–		3	–	6	–	0
NYU		–		2	–	7	–	0
Yale		–		1	–	7	–	0
Army		–		1	–	7	–	1
CCNY		–		1	–	5	–	1
Massachusetts State		–		1	–	8	–	0
Rankings from AP Poll

The 1940 Fordham Rams football team represented Fordham University during the 1940 college football season. The Rams finished the regular season ranked twelfth and played in the Cotton Bowl in Dallas on New Year's Day, a 13–12 loss to sixth-ranked Texas A&M.

== Schedule ==
Date	Opponent	Rank	Site	Result	Attendance	Source
October 5	West Virginia		Randall's Island Stadium; New York, NY	W 20–7	17,780	
October 12	Tulane		Polo Grounds; New York, NY	W 20–7	35,400	
October 19	at Pittsburgh	No. 11	Pitt Stadium; Pittsburgh, PA	W 24–12	40,000	
October 26	Saint Mary's	No. 11	Polo Grounds; New York, NY	L 12–24	34,500	
November 2	North Carolina		Polo Grounds; New York, NY	W 14–0	16,794	
November 9	Purdue	No. 17	Polo Grounds; New York, NY	W 13–7	28,576	
November 21	Arkansas	No. 15	Polo Grounds; New York, NY	W 27–7	16,500	
November 30	vs. NYU	No. 14	Yankee Stadium; Bronx, NY	W 26–0	35,000	
January 1, 1941	vs. No. 6 Texas A&M	No. 12	Cotton Bowl; Dallas, TX (Cotton Bowl)	L 12–13	45,507	
Rankings from AP Poll released prior to the game

== Rankings ==
Ranking movements Legend: ██ Increase in ranking ██ Decrease in ranking — = Not ranked
	Week							
Poll	1	2	3	4	5	6	7	Final
AP	11	11	—	17	13	15	14	12
