= 1940 Penn Quakers football team =

American college football season

1940 Penn Quakers football
- Conference: Independent

Ranking
- AP: No. 14
- Record: 6–1–1
- Head coach: George Munger (3rd season)
- Captain: Ray Frick
- Home stadium: Franklin Field

1940 Eastern college football independents records
	Conf.			Overall
Team	W	L	T	W		L		T
No. 5 Boston College		–		11	–	0	–	0
Duquesne		–		7	–	1	–	0
No. 14 Penn		–		6	–	1	–	1
Penn State		–		6	–	1	–	1
No. 12 Fordham		–		7	–	2	–	0
No. 15 Cornell		–		6	–	2	–	0
La Salle		–		6	–	2	–	0
Princeton		–		5	–	2	–	1
Columbia		–		5	–	2	–	2
Brown		–		6	–	3	–	1
Bucknell		–		4	–	2	–	2
Boston University		–		5	–	3	–	0
Colgate		–		5	–	3	–	0
Hofstra		–		4	–	3	–	0
Harvard		–		3	–	2	–	3
Dartmouth		–		5	–	4	–	0
Temple		–		4	–	4	–	1
Tufts		–		4	–	4	–	0
Vermont		–		4	–	4	–	0
Villanova		–		4	–	5	–	0
Pittsburgh		–		3	–	4	–	1
Syracuse		–		3	–	4	–	1
Buffalo		–		3	–	5	–	0
Carnegie Tech		–		3	–	5	–	0
Manhattan		–		3	–	6	–	0
Providence		–		3	–	6	–	0
NYU		–		2	–	7	–	0
Yale		–		1	–	7	–	0
Army		–		1	–	7	–	1
CCNY		–		1	–	5	–	1
Massachusetts State		–		1	–	8	–	0
Rankings from AP Poll

The 1940 Penn Quakers football team was an American football team that represented the University of Pennsylvania as an independent during the 1940 college football season. In their third season under head coach George Munger, the Quakers compiled a 6–1–1 record, were ranked No. 14 in the final AP Poll, and outscored opponents by a total of 247 to 79.

Penn was ranked at No. 5 (out of 697 college football teams) in the final rankings under the Litkenhous Difference by Score system for 1940.

The team played its home games at Franklin Field in Philadelphia.

== Schedule ==
Date	Opponent	Rank	Site	Result	Attendance	Source
October 5	Maryland		Franklin Field; Philadelphia, PA	W 51–0	52,000	
October 12	Yale		Franklin Field; Philadelphia, PA	W 50–7	50,000	
October 19	Princeton	No. 9	Franklin Field; Philadelphia, PA (rivalry)	W 46–28	55,000	
October 26	at No. 3 Michigan	No. 8	Michigan Stadium; Ann Arbor, MI	L 0–15	59,913	
November 2	No. 14 Navy	No. 15	Franklin Field; Philadelphia, PA	W 20–0	70,200	
November 9	Harvard	No. 15	Franklin Field; Philadelphia, PA (rivalry)	T 10–10	35,000	
November 16	Army		Franklin Field; Philadelphia, PA	W 48–0	47,000	
November 23	No. 5 Cornell	No. 12	Franklin Field; Philadelphia, PA (rivalry)	W 22–20	80,000	
Rankings from AP Poll released prior to the game

== Rankings ==
Ranking movements Legend: ██ Increase in ranking ██ Decrease in ranking — = Not ranked т = Tied with team above or below
	Week							
Poll	1	2	3	4	5	6	7	Final
AP	9	8	15т	15	—	12	10	14
