= 1940 Cornell Big Red football team =

American college football season

1940 Cornell Big Red football
- Conference: Independent

Ranking
- AP: No. 15
- Record: 6–2
- Head coach: Carl Snavely (5th season)
- Offensive scheme: Single-wing
- Captain: Walter Matuszczak
- Home stadium: Schoellkopf Field

1940 Eastern college football independents records
	Conf.			Overall
Team	W	L	T	W		L		T
No. 5 Boston College		–		11	–	0	–	0
Duquesne		–		7	–	1	–	0
No. 14 Penn		–		6	–	1	–	1
Penn State		–		6	–	1	–	1
No. 12 Fordham		–		7	–	2	–	0
No. 15 Cornell		–		6	–	2	–	0
La Salle		–		6	–	2	–	0
Princeton		–		5	–	2	–	1
Columbia		–		5	–	2	–	2
Brown		–		6	–	3	–	1
Bucknell		–		4	–	2	–	2
Boston University		–		5	–	3	–	0
Colgate		–		5	–	3	–	0
Hofstra		–		4	–	3	–	0
Harvard		–		3	–	2	–	3
Dartmouth		–		5	–	4	–	0
Temple		–		4	–	4	–	1
Tufts		–		4	–	4	–	0
Vermont		–		4	–	4	–	0
Villanova		–		4	–	5	–	0
Pittsburgh		–		3	–	4	–	1
Syracuse		–		3	–	4	–	1
Buffalo		–		3	–	5	–	0
Carnegie Tech		–		3	–	5	–	0
Manhattan		–		3	–	6	–	0
Providence		–		3	–	6	–	0
NYU		–		2	–	7	–	0
Yale		–		1	–	7	–	0
Army		–		1	–	7	–	1
CCNY		–		1	–	5	–	1
Massachusetts State		–		1	–	8	–	0
Rankings from AP Poll

The 1940 Cornell Big Red football team was an American football team that represented Cornell University during the 1940 college football season. In their fifth season under head coach Carl Snavely, the Big Red compiled a 6–2 record and outscored their opponents by a combined total of 201 to 38.

Cornell was ranked at No. 7 (out of 697 college football teams) in the final rankings under the Litkenhous Difference by Score system for 1940.

== Schedule ==
Date	Opponent	Rank	Site	Result	Attendance	Source
October 5	Colgate		Schoellkopf Field; Ithaca, NY (rivalry)	W 34–0	15,000	
October 12	at Army		Michie Stadium; West Point, NY	W 45–0	27,917	
October 19	Syracuse	No. 1	Schoellkopf Field; Ithaca, NY	W 33–6	18,000	
October 26	Ohio State	No. 1	Schoellkopf Field; Ithaca, NY	W 21–7	34,500	
November 2	Columbia	No. 1	Schoellkopf Field; Ithaca, NY (rivalry)	W 27–0	13,500	
November 9	at Yale	No. 1	Yale Bowl; New Haven, CT	W 21–0	30,000	
November 16	at Dartmouth	No. 2	Memorial Field; Hanover, NH (rivalry)	L 0–3	10,000	
November 23	at No. 12 Penn	No. 5	Franklin Field; Philadelphia, PA (rivalry)	L 20–22	80,000	
Rankings from AP Poll released prior to the game

== Rankings ==
Ranking movements Legend: ██ Increase in ranking ██ Decrease in ranking ( ) = First-place votes
	Week							
Poll	1	2	3	4	5	6	7	Final
AP	1 (90)	1 (83)	1 (81.5)	1 (119)	2 (45.33)	5 (6)	13	15

== Dartmouth game controversy ==
Bill Murphy scored a touchdown in the last few seconds of the Dartmouth game, resulting in a 7–3 win for Cornell being officially recorded. However, observers felt that an illegal fifth down had occurred, and therefore the touchdown was invalid. After developing and reviewing filmed footage of the game, the referee agreed. Cornell coach Carl Snavely agreed to give up the win, and thus the official score was revised to 3–0 in favor of Dartmouth. The loss broke Cornell's 18-game winning streak. As of 2024, it is believed to be the "only collegiate sporting contest to be decided off the field after its completion."
