= 1940 college football rankings =

- Season: 1940
- Bowl season: 1940–41 bowl games
- End of season champions: Minnesota (Note: per AP poll, Boand System, Dickinson System, Houlgate System, Litkenhous Ratings, Berryman QPRS, College Football Researchers Association, DeVold System, National Championship Foundation, Sagarin Ratings Elo chess method, Sagarin Ratings Predictor method); Stanford (Note: per Poling System, Billingsley Report, Helms Athletic Foundation); Tennessee (Note: per Dunkel System and Williamson System)

Several major systems have determined the 1940 college football rankings. Unlike most sports, college football's governing body, the NCAA, did not itself bestow a national championship.

== Champions (by ranking) ==
The AP poll and most other rankings consider Minnesota the season's champion. However, three rankings consider Stanford the champion, and two consider Tennessee the champion.

- AP poll: Minnesota
- Berryman QPRS: Minnesota
- Billingsley Report: Stanford
- Boand System: Minnesota
- College Football Researchers Association: Minnesota
- DeVold System: Minnesota
- Dickinson System: Minnesota
- Dunkel System: Tennessee
- Helms Athletic Foundation: Stanford
- Houlgate System: Minnesota
- Litkenhous Ratings: Minnesota
- National Championship Foundation: Minnesota
- Poling System: Stanford
- Sagarin Ratings Elo chess method: Minnesota
- Sagarin Ratings Predictor method: Minnesota
- Williamson System: Tennessee

Note: AP Poll, Boand System, Dickinson System, Dunkel System, Houlgate System, Litkenhous Ratings, Poling System, and Williamson System were given contemporarily. All other methods were given retroactively.

== AP Poll ==
=== Legend ===
	Increase in ranking
	Decrease in ranking
	Not ranked previous week
	National champion
(#–#)	Win–loss record
(Italics)	Number of first place votes
т	Tied with team above or below also with this symbol

The final AP Poll was released on December 2, at the end of the 1940 regular season, weeks before the major bowls. The AP would not release a post-bowl season final poll regularly until 1968.

	Week 1 Oct 14	Week 2 Oct 21	Week 3 Oct 28	Week 4 Nov 4	Week 5 Nov 11	Week 6 Nov 18	Week 7 Nov 25	Week 8 (Final) Dec 2^{A}	
1.	Cornell (2–0) (90)	Cornell (3–0) (83)	Cornell (4–0) (81.5)	Cornell (5–0) (119)	Minnesota (6–0) (55.33)	Minnesota (7–0) (68)	Minnesota (8–0) (88)	Minnesota (8–0) (65)	1.
2.	Texas A&M (3–0) (25)	Notre Dame (3–0) (30)	Notre Dame (4–0) (40.5)	Minnesota (5–0) (18)	Cornell (6–0) (45.33)	Texas A&M (8–0) (59)	Texas A&M (8–0) (41)	Stanford (9–0) (44)	2.
3.	Michigan (3–0) (26)	Michigan (4–0) (18)	Michigan (5–0) (16)	Michigan (5–0) (11)	Texas A&M (7–0) (31.33)	Stanford (8–0) (24)	Stanford (8–0) (15)	Michigan (7–1) (5)	3.
4.	Northwestern (2–0) (1)	Texas A&M (4–0) (15)	Minnesota (4–0) (13)	Texas A&M (6–0) (14)	Stanford (7–0) (12)	Boston College (8–0) (12)	Boston College (9–0) (15)	Tennessee (10–0) (10)	4.
5.	Tennessee (3–0) (7)	Tennessee (4–0) (6)	Texas A&M (5–0) (9)	Tennessee (6–0) (11)	Tennessee (7–0) (2)	Cornell (6–1) (6)	Michigan (7–1) (3)	Boston College (10–0) (7)	5.
6.	Notre Dame (2–0) (5)	Minnesota (3–0) (8)	Stanford (5–0)	Stanford (6–0) (3)	Michigan (5–1)	Tennessee (8–0) (3)	Tennessee (9–0) (8)	Texas A&M (8–1) (1)	6.
7.	Minnesota (2–0) (2)	Northwestern (3–0)	Tennessee (5–0)	Notre Dame (5–0)	Notre Dame (6–0)	Michigan (6–1)	Northwestern (6–2)	Nebraska (8–1)	7.
8.	Boston College (3–0)	Penn (3–0)	Northwestern (4–0) (1)	Boston College (6–0) (2)	Boston College (7–0)	Nebraska (6–1)	Nebraska (7–1)	Northwestern (6–2)	8.
9.	Penn (2–0)	Stanford (4–0)	Boston College (5–0) (2)	Georgetown (6–0)	Georgetown (7–0)	Georgetown (7–1)	Georgetown (8–1)	Mississippi State (9–0–1) (1)	9.
10.	Stanford (3–0)	Boston College (4–0)	Clemson (5–0) (2) т	Northwestern (4–1)	Northwestern (5–1)	Northwestern (5–2)	Penn (6–1–1)	Washington (7–2)	10.
11.	Fordham (2–0)	Fordham (3–0)	Georgetown (5–0) (2) т	Washington (4–1)	Nebraska (5–1)	Ole Miss (8–1)	Mississippi State (8–0–1)	Santa Clara (6–1–1)	11.
12.	Clemson (4–0)	Texas (4–0)	Nebraska (3–1)	Duke (4–1) т	Duke (5–1) (2)	Penn (5–1–1)	Washington (6–2)	Fordham (7–1)	12.
13.	Ole Miss (4–0)	Clemson (4–0) (1)	Washington (4–1)	Nebraska (4–1) т	Fordham (5–1)	Washington (5–2)	Cornell (6–2)	Georgetown (8–1)	13.
14.	Texas (3–0)	Ole Miss (5–0) (1)	Navy (5–0)	SMU (4–0–1)	Alabama (5–1)	Notre Dame (6–1)	Fordham (6–1)	Penn (6–1–1)	14.
15.	Ohio State (2–1)	Georgetown (4–0)	Penn (3–1) т	Penn (4–1)	Mississippi State (6–0–1)	Fordham (5–1)	Santa Clara (5–1–1)	Cornell (6–2)	15.
16.	Washington (2–1)	Washington (3–1)	SMU (3–0–1) т	Penn State (5–0)	Santa Clara (3–1–1)	Mississippi State (7–0–1)	SMU (6–1–1)	SMU (7–1–1)	16.
17.	USC (1–0–2)	USC (2–0–2)	Detroit (5–0)	Fordham (4–1)	Ole Miss (7–1) т	Alabama (6–1)	Alabama (7–1)	Hardin-Simmons (8–0)	17.
18.	Oregon State (2–0–1)	Nebraska (2–1)	Duke (3–1) т	Lafayette (6–0)	Washington (4–2) т	SMU (5–1–1)	Lafayette (9–0) т	Duke (7–2)	18.
19.	Washington State (2–0–1)	SMU (3–0–1)	Penn State (4–0) т	Mississippi State (5–0–1) т	Oregon State (5–1–1)	Santa Clara (4–1–1)	Texas Tech (8–0–1) т	Lafayette (9–0)	19.
20.	Iowa (2–0)	Columbia (3–0)	Mississippi State (4–0–1) т; Santa Clara (2–1–1) т	Santa Clara (3–1–1) т	Penn State (5–0–1) т; SMU (4–1–1) т	Penn State (6–0–1) т; Texas Tech (7–0–1) т	Duke (6–2) т; Hardin-Simmons (7–0) т		20.
	Week 1 Oct 14	Week 2 Oct 21	Week 3 Oct 28	Week 4 Nov 4	Week 5 Nov 11	Week 6 Nov 18	Week 7 Nov 25	Week 8 (Final) Dec 2^{A}	
		Dropped: Iowa; Ohio State; Oregon State; Washington State	Dropped: Columbia; Fordham; Ole Miss; Texas; USC	Dropped: Clemson; Detroit; Navy	Dropped: Lafayette; Penn	Dropped: Duke; Oregon State	Dropped: Ole Miss; Notre Dame; Penn State	Dropped: Alabama; Texas Tech	

A. Only 19 teams received votes in the final poll.

== Boand System ==
The final Boand System rankings (also known as "Azzi Ratem") were released after the bowl games in early January 1941. Boand's final rankings were as follows:

1. Minnesota (86.4)
2. Stanford (83.1)
3. Boston College (83.0)
4. Michigan (81.8)
5. Texas A&M (80.3)
6. Tennessee (80.2)
7. Mississippi State (79.6)
8. SMU (76.9)
9. Northwestern (76.9)
10. Penn (76.2)
11. Texas (76.1)
12. Nebraska (76.0)

== Dickinson System ==
The final Dickinson System rankings released in December 1940 were as follows:

1. Minnesota (29.55)
2. Michigan (26.16)
3. Stanford (25.84)
4. Tennessee (25.76)
5. Texas A&M (25.74)
6. Penn (24.78)
7. Mississippi State (24.28)
8. SMU (23.82)
9. Texas (23.33)
10. Nebraska (23.12)
11. Northwestern (22.51)
12. Boston College (22.14)

== Dunkel System ==
The final Dunkel System rankings released in December 1940 were as follows:

1. Tennessee
2. Minnesota
3. Michigan
4. Boston College
5. Stanford
6. Washington
7. Mississippi State
8. Northwestern
9. Texas A&M
10. Georgetown
11. SMU
12. Texas
13. LSU
14. Penn
15. Santa Clara
16. Cornell
17. Duke
18. Fordham
19. Nebraska
20. Oregon

== Litkenhous Ratings ==
The final Litkenhous Ratings released in December 1940 provided numerical rankings to 697 college football programs. The top 100 ranked teams were:

1. Minnesota
2. Tennessee
3. Michigan
4. Northwestern
5. Penn
6. Stanford
7. Cornell
8. Boston College
9. Texas A&M
10. Washington
11. Duke
12. Georgetown
13. Texas
14. Santa Clara
15. Nebraska
16. Mississippi State
17. Fordham
18. Ohio State
19. SMU
20. Notre Dame
21. Rice
22. Michigan State
23. Ole Miss
24. Alabama
25. Iowa
26. Indiana
27. Wisconsin
28. Tulane
29. Purdue
30. Pittsburgh
31. Auburn
32. Oregon
33. LSU
34. Marshall
35. Temple
36. Oregon State
37. Missouri
38. Detroit
39. Baylor
40. California
41. USC
42. TCU
43. Colgate
44. Kentucky
45. Oklahoma
46. Navy
47. North Carolina
48. Duquesne
49. Saint Mary's
50. Tulsa
51. Harvard
52. Penn State
53. Georgia
54. Clemson
55. Hardin–Simmons
56. Villanova
57. Wake Forest
58. Princeton
59. Georgia Tech
60. UCLA
61. Columbia
62. Illinois
63. Vanderbilt
64. Florida
65. Syracuse
66. Utah
67. Arkansas
68. Colorado
69. Lafayette
70. Texas Tech
71. Washington State
72. Dartmouth
73. Manhattan
74. San Jose State
75. Holy Cross
76. Arizona
77. Denver
78. Chattanooga
79. Mississippi College
80. Oklahoma A&M
81. Furman
82. Marquette
83. NC State
84. San Diego Marines
85. VMI
86. North Texas State Teachers
87. William & Mary
88. Boston University
89. San Francisco
90. Dayton
91. Creighton
92. Southwest Missouri State
93. George Washington
94. Gonzaga
95. West Virginia
96. Rollins
97. Virginia
98. VPI
99. Eastern Kentucky
100. Rutgers

== Williamson System ==
The final Williamson System rankings for 1940 were as follows:

1. Stanford
2. Boston College
3. Minnesota
4. Michigan
5. Mississippi State
6. Tennessee
7. Texas A&M
8. Santa Clara
9. Fordham
10. Nebraska
11. SMU
12. Washington
13. Penn
14. Northwestern
15. Georgetown
16. Alabama
17. Ole Miss
18. Duke
19. Duquesne
20. Saint Mary's (CA)
21. Cornell
22. Rice
23. Notre Dame
24. Texas
25. Navy
26. Oklahoma
27. LSU
28. Syracuse
29. Columbia
30. Auburn
31. Ohio State
32. Colgate
33. Pittsburgh
34. Hardin-Simmons
35. Missouri
36. Wisconsin
37. Penn State
38. Tulane
39. Indiana
40. Arizona State

== See also ==
- 1940 College Football All-America Team
