= John F. Druze =

American football player and coach (1914–2005)

John Druze
No. 3
- Position: End

Personal information
- Born: July 3, 1914; Newark, New Jersey, U.S.
- Died: December 27, 2005 (aged 91); Scottsdale, Arizona, U.S.
- Listed height: 6 ft 0 in (1.83 m)
- Listed weight: 195 lb (88 kg)

Career information
- High school: Frank H. Morrell (Irvington, New Jersey)
- College: Fordham (1934-1937)
- NFL draft: 1938: 11th round, 93rd overall pick

Career history

Playing
- Brooklyn Dodgers (1938)

Coaching
- Boston College (1939-1940) Ends coach; Notre Dame (1941, 1946-1955) Ends coach; Marquette (1956-1958) Head coach; Boston College (1959) Ends coach

Career NFL statistics
- Receptions: 4
- Receiving yards: 29
- Stats at Pro Football Reference

Head coaching record
- Career: 2–26–1 (.086)

John Francis Druze (July 3, 1914 – December 27, 2005) was an American football player and coach.

== Playing career ==
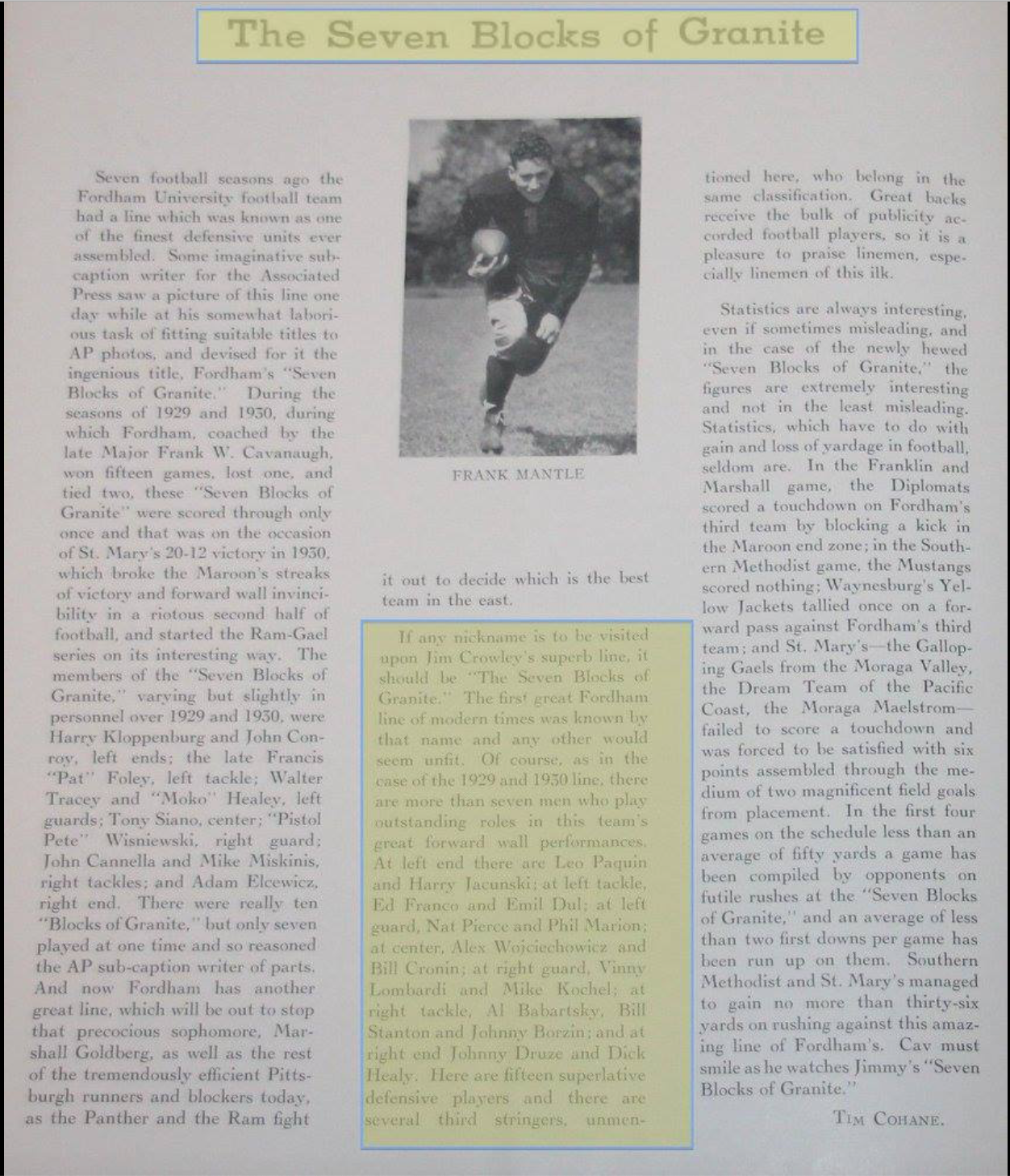

Druze, who was known as "Tarzan", played right end and placekicker for the Fordham Rams football team. In 1936, Tim Cohane, Fordham University's publicist, discovered a newspaper clipping from 1930 paying tribute to Fordham's linemen by calling them the Seven Blocks of Granite. Cohane revived the nickname for the Rams' 1936 and 1937 lines, and it was this second version (Druze, Al Babartsky, Vince Lombardi, Alex Wojciechowicz, Nat Pierce, Ed Franco, and Leo Paquin) that gained the greatest renown. The 1936 Rams finished 5–1–2 and lost a possible Rose Bowl bid when they were upset by New York University at Yankee Stadium, 7–6, in the season's final game. He was captain of the 7–0–1 1937 team.

Druze was an 11th round (93rd overall) pick of the 1938 NFL draft by the Brooklyn Dodgers. He left the team after one season to go into coaching.

== Coaching career ==
In 1939, Druze became an assistant to Frank Leahy, who had been his position coach at Fordham, at Boston College. In 1941, Leahy became the head coach at Notre Dame and brought his entire coaching staff, including Druze, with him. During World War II, he was a fitness instructor in the United States Navy. He returned to Notre Dame in 1946 and was the position coach for 1949 Heisman Trophy winner Leon Hart.

In 1956, Druze became the head football coach at Marquette University. He held the position for three seasons (1956–1958) and compiled a record of 2 wins, 25 losses, and 1 tie.

In 1959, he returned to Boston College as an assistant under Mike Holovak.

== Later life ==
After coaching, Druze worked as a salesman for the Denver-Chicago Trucking Company. He retired at the age of 62 and spent his later years in Scottsdale, Arizona. He died on December 27, 2005. He was survived by his wife of 63 years and their two daughters.

== Head coaching record ==
=== College ===
Year	Team	Overall	Conference	Standing	Bowl/playoffs
Marquette Warriors (Independent) (1956–1958)
1956	Marquette	0–9			
1957	Marquette	0–10			
1958	Marquette	2–7–1			
Marquette:		2–26–1			
Total:		2–26–1			
