= Leo Paquin =

American football player (1910–1993)

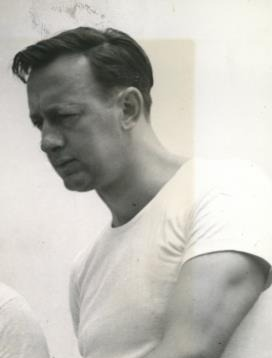
- Paquin in 1942

Profile
- Position: Left end

Personal information
- Born: June 15, 1910; Brockton, Massachusetts
- Died: December 2, 1993 (aged 83); Rutherford, New Jersey

Career information
- College: Fordham

Leo Paquin (June 15, 1910 – December 2, 1993) was an American football player. He played end for Fordham University as part of the 1936 line known as the "Seven Blocks of Granite". After graduating from Fordham, he eschewed a professional football career in favor of a 40-year career as a high school football coach and teacher.

== Biography ==
Paquin grew up in Brockton, Massachusetts, and he attended Fordham University where he played college football as an end. While there, he roomed with another Fordham lineman, Vince Lombardi. As a senior in 1936, Paquin played as the left end on the Fordham line known as the "Seven Blocks of Granite". That line was actually the second one to bear that name. Fordham University publicist Tim Cohane had first applied the moniker to the Fordham line of the 1929 and 1930 seasons in an effort to garner the same level of recognition as Notre Dame's famed Four Horsemen. Incidentally, Jim Crowley, who coached Paquin and the second Seven Blocks of Granite had been one of the Four Horsemen.

Fordham finished the 1936 season with a 5–1–2 record, but was more storied than its more successful counterparts from the subsequent year or the late 1920s. The final game was an upset at the hands of their cross-town rivals and heavy underdogs, NYU, which precluded a Rose Bowl invitation. Nevertheless, Crowley called that Fordham squad the "greatest defensive team I've ever seen", implying that it was superior to his own Notre Dame teams which included the Four Horsemen and their front line, the "Seven Mules". Paquin's graceful play earned him the nickname "Twinkletoes". While at Fordham, he made the dean's list all four years.

The New York Giants recruited Paquin to play professional football, but he turned down the offer. Instead, Paquin took a coaching position at Xavier High School in Manhattan, where he remained for the next four decades. Paquin worked at Xavier as a football coach, athletic director, and an English and Latin teacher. Paquin served a stint in the U.S. Navy during World War II. He married Elsie Paquin, with whom he had a son, Leo, and two daughters, Noreen A. Then and Anne E. Kane. On December 2, 1993, he died in his sleep at his home in Rutherford, New Jersey. Paquin was 83 years old.
