= 1941 Cotton Bowl Classic =

- 5th Cotton Bowl Classic
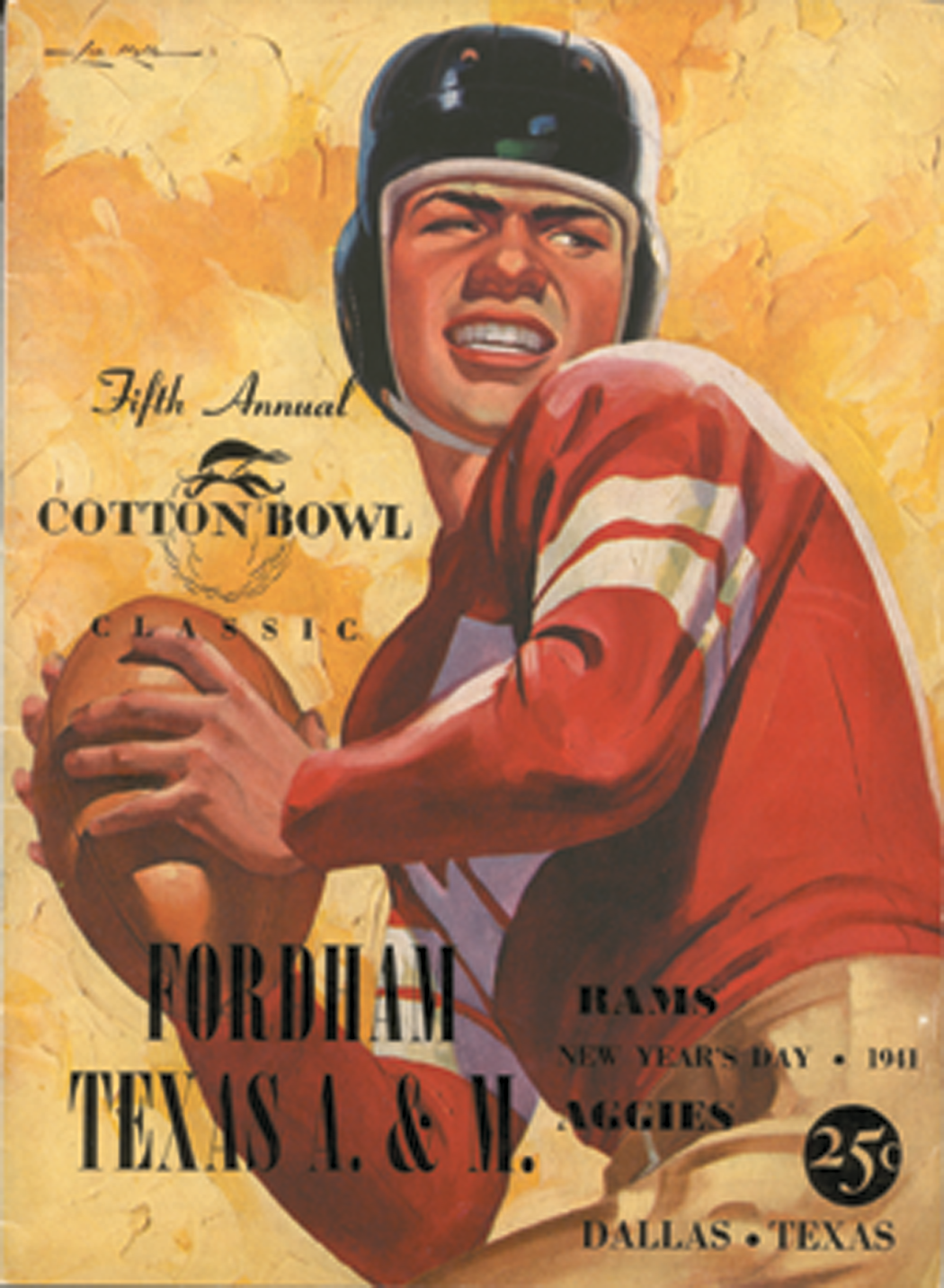
Fordham Rams	Texas A&M Aggies
(7–1)	(8–1)
Independent	SWC
12	13
Head coach: Jim Crowley	Head coach: Homer Norton
AP 12	AP 6
	1	2	3	4	Total
Fordham	0	6	0	6	12
Texas A&M	0	0	13	0	13
- Date: January 1, 1941
- Season: 1940
- Stadium: Cotton Bowl
- Location: Dallas, Texas
- MVP: C Lou DeFilippo (Fordham); T Joe Ungerer (Fordham); G Charles Henke (Texas A&M); FB John Kimbrough (Texas A&M); T Chip Routt (Texas A&M)
- Attendance: 45,507

The Cotton Bowl in Dallas, Texas, hosted the Cotton Bowl Classic.

The 1941 Cotton Bowl Classic was the fifth edition of the Dallas bowl game, which began in 1937, and featured the #6 Texas A&M Aggies and the #12 Fordham Rams. It was the first Cotton Bowl under Southwest Conference sponsorship and the first sold out game.

== Background ==
This was A&M's third bowl game appearance, having played in the 1922 Dixie Classic (most famous for the birth of the 12th Man) and the 1940 Sugar Bowl. A&M was co-champions of the Southwestern Conference along with SMU, due to A&M losing to Texas, which cost them a shot at the national championship. This was Fordham's first bowl game for a program that had suspended football twice. They had been ranked as high as eleventh until the loss to St. Mary's in late October.

== Game Summary ==
Steve Filipowicz started the scoring in the second quarter with his touchdown run, but Steve Hudacek's extra point was blocked by Jim Sterling. Trailing 6-0 into the second half, Earl "Alabama" Smith caught a 60 yard pass from Marion Pugh on a trick play in which Smith whizzed by Fordham defenders who had failed to notice him as the ball was snapped. The extra point was blocked, though. John Kimbrough made it 13-6 A&M with his touchdown run as the third quarter ended. Fordham recovered a fumble, and James Blumenstock scored on a touchdown run. But on the extra point attempt to tie the game, Hudacek's extra point was once again blocked, this time by Martin Ruby, with twelve minutes to go. But from that point on, neither team scored again as A&M won their first Cotton Bowl, which they would not win again until 1968.

== Aftermath ==
Texas A&M returned to the Cotton Bowl the next year, but lost to Alabama.

Fordham won the Sugar Bowl the next season; it remains their most recent bowl game.

== Statistics ==
Statistics	Texas A&M	Fordham
First downs	8	13
Yards rushing	52	118
Yards passing	101	62
Total yards	153	180
Punts-Average	10-32.9	8-30.4
Fumbles lost	3	1
Interceptions	1	3
Penalties-Yards	3-25	2-29
