= Fordham Rams football =

Intercollegiate American football team for Fordham University

2026 Fordham Rams football team
- First season: 1882; 144 years ago
- Athletic director: Charles Guthrie
- Head coach: Joe Conlin; 8th season, 32–52 (.381)
- Location: Bronx, New York
- Stadium: Coffey Field (capacity: 7,000)
- NCAA division: Division I FCS
- Conference: Patriot League
- Colors: Maroon and white
- All-time record: 570–485–48 (.539)
- Bowl record: 1–1 (.500)

Conference championships
- Metropolitan Intercollegiate: 1977 Liberty: 1987, 1988 Patriot League: 2002, 2007, 2014
- Consensus All-Americans: 2
- Rivalries: Columbia (Liberty Cup); Holy Cross (Ram–Crusader Cup)

Uniforms
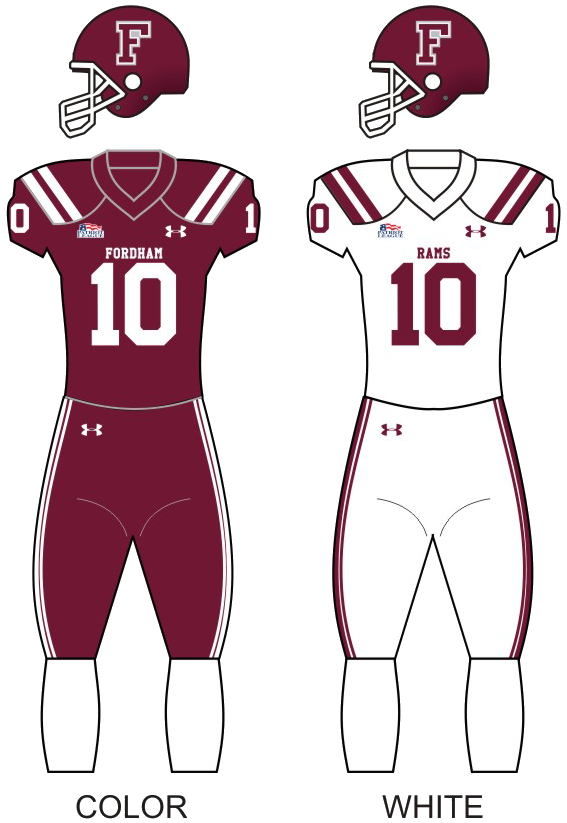
- Fight song: "The Ram"
- Mascot: Rameses
- Website: FordhamSports.com

The Fordham Rams football program is the intercollegiate American football team for Fordham University, located in the borough of The Bronx in New York City. The team competes in the NCAA Division I Football Championship Subdivision (FCS) and are members of the Patriot League. Fordham's first football team was fielded 144 years ago in 1882; the team plays its home games on campus at 7,000-seat Coffey Field.

Since 2018, the Rams have been led by head coach Joe Conlin, previously the offensive coordinator at Yale. He is a distant relative of Ed Conlin (1933–2012), Fordham's all-time leading scorer in basketball who played seven seasons in the NBA.

== History ==
Fordham, then known as St. John's College, played its first official intercollegiate football game in 1882. The Rams beat Seton Hall 1–0 at home and followed that with a 2–1 road victory in New Jersey. The points seem to represent goals as the game, even after Walter Camp's creation of a line of scrimmage and a system of downs, was very different during its early days. Scheduling was also different as the bulk of Fordham's early opposition came from local athletic clubs, military and naval units, YMCA groups and even its own reserve team. When up against other colleges, Fordham's primary rivals were Xavier (a school that later dropped its college division but still exists as a high school and to this day is a rival of Fordham Prep), CCNY, Saint Peter's and Seton Hall.

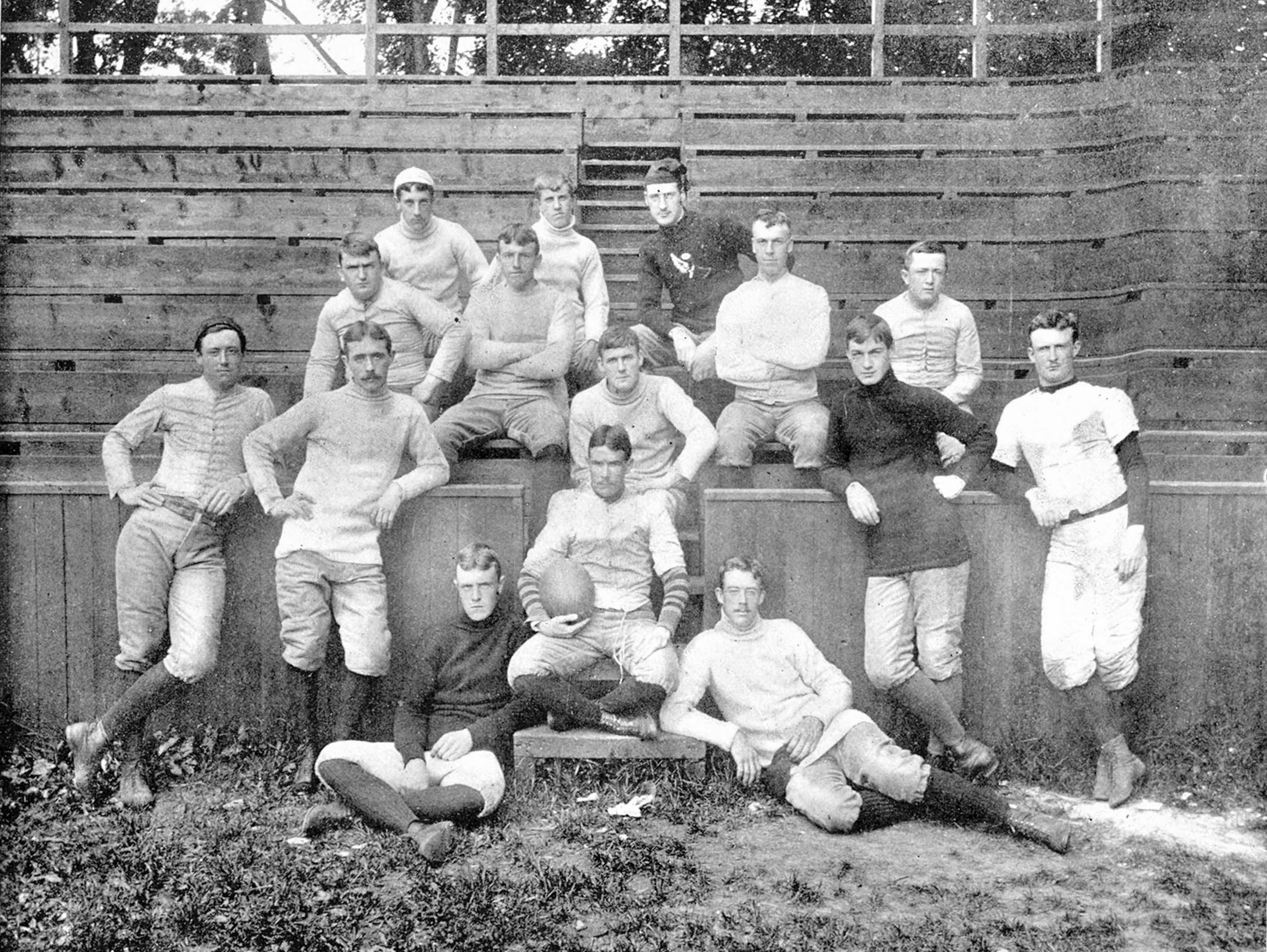
Fordham team of 1890–91

At around the turn of the century Fordham began occasionally mixing more established universities like NYU, Columbia, Rutgers, Princeton, Cornell, and Syracuse to their schedule but, for the most part, was still playing at a smaller level. Aside from a budding rivalry with cross-borough NYU, by the 1920s the bulk of Fordham's opposition came from elite Catholic schools like Boston College, Holy Cross, Villanova, and Georgetown. Toward the end of that decade Fordham made a drastic jump in moving up and playing within college football's major level. Program changes included the hiring of Hall of Fame coach Frank Cavanaugh, more challenging, national schedule and a move from on-campus home games at Fordham Field (current site of the practice facility Murphy Field, softball diamond, and tennis courts) to the 55,000-seat Polo Grounds in upper Manhattan.

From 1929 until the program went on hiatus after 1942, the Rams reeled off fourteen consecutive winning seasons and often played in front of capacity or near-capacity crowds. Rivals during this era included NYU, Saint Mary's (CA), Pittsburgh, Purdue, North Carolina, and West Virginia. After the 1935 season, United Press (later UPI) conducted the first-ever national poll. Fordham finished with a Top-20 ranking and followed that with six straight additional Top-20 (AP) finishes from 1936 through 1941. Only Duke also finished in the Top 20 in each of those first seven years of postseason polls. Fordham's best finish came in its undefeated 1937 season (7–0–1) when it ended the year ranked third in the country.

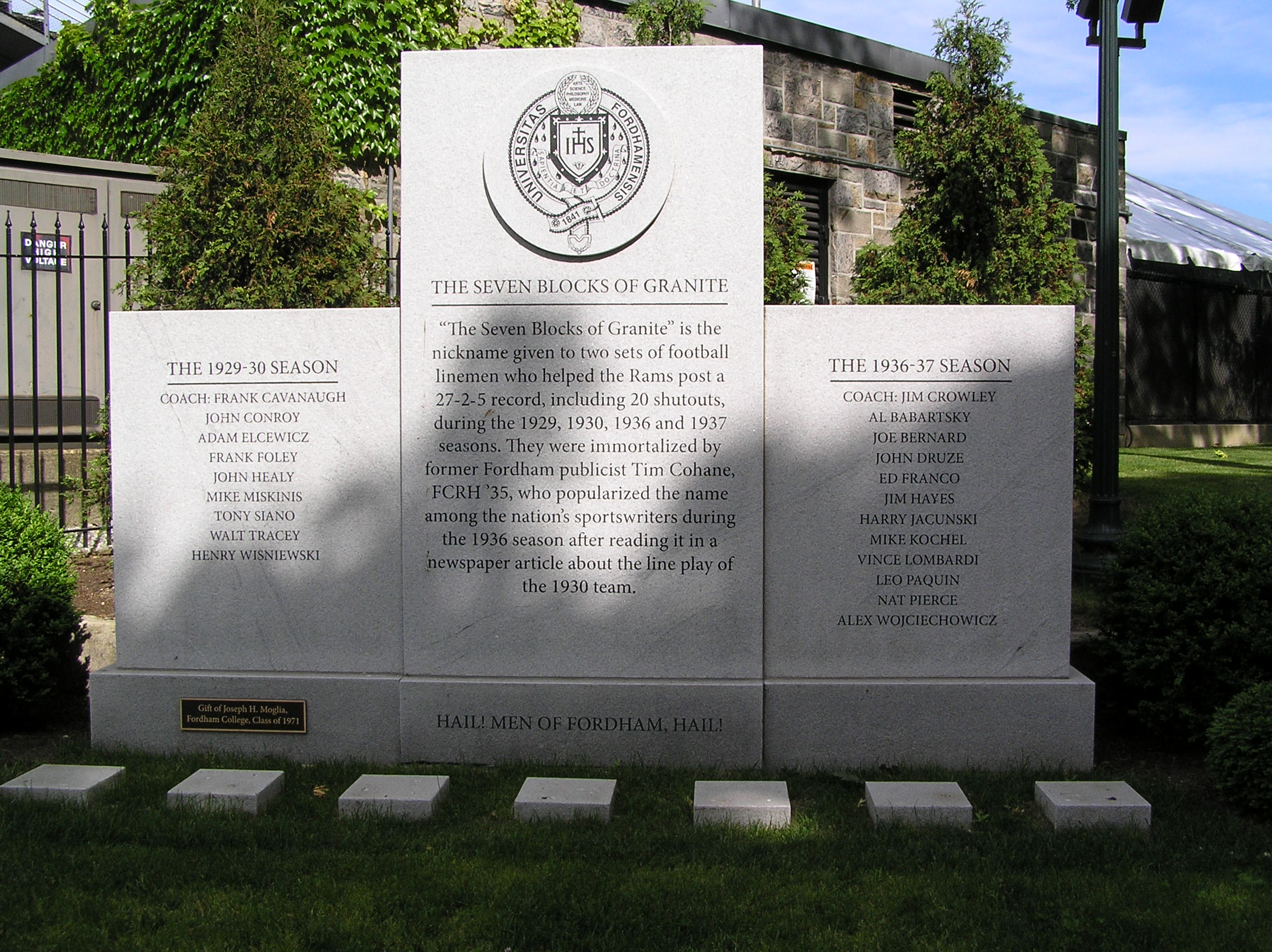
The Seven Blocks of Granite monument, west of Coffey Field grandstand

Memorable victories during this era began with one over Boston College in 1929, ending the Eagles' 17-game unbeaten streak, still a school record. From there Fordham defeated NYU in 1930 in front of 78,500 spectators at Yankee Stadium for a contest that both teams entered undefeated. Other wins came against Detroit in 1931, St. Mary's in 1932, a major upset over Alabama in 1933, another upset, over Tennessee, in 1934 and another win over NYU in 1935. That result cost the Violets a chance to play in the Rose Bowl. NYU returned the favor the next season by upsetting the Rams and ending Fordham's "Rose Hill to the Rose Bowl" campaign. Further conquests included North Carolina in 1937, South Carolina in 1938 and Pitt in 1939.

The Pitt rivalry began in 1935 when the teams settled for a scoreless tie. The squads exchanged scoreless draws in 1936 and 1937 (when the Panthers won a national championship) as well in what was later dubbed the "Much Ado About Nothing to Nothing" series. After 13 consecutive scoreless quarters Pitt broke the drought with a second-quarter field goal in their 1938 encounter won by the Panthers, 24–13. After some revenge for Fordham in 1939, the Rams again beat Pitt in 1940 and later earned a trip to the Cotton Bowl in Dallas.

Two blocked extra points were the difference in their 13–12 loss on New Year's Day to Texas A&M, the defending national champions. A win over TCU the following season set up a Sugar Bowl date against Missouri. In a monsoon setting, a first-quarter blocked punt through the end zone gave the Rams a 2–0 lead that held until the game's waning moments. The Tigers missed a last-minute field goal, and Fordham won by the lowest American-football score possible. Back at the Polo Grounds in their 1942 rematch, Fordham again beat Missouri, 20–12. Still, the season as a whole was only mediocre. Fordham finished 5–3–1 and unranked (introduced in 1935) for the first time ever.

The era subsequently came to a close as football was suspended for the remainder of World War II. Prior to that the Rams had gone 88–20–12 (.783) during their 1929–1942 glory years. Over that same period, only Alabama had a higher winning percentage in all of college football. Other milestones for the Rams included a 34–7 win over little-known Waynesburg to start the 1939 season. That contest was famous for being the first televised college football game. A week later, in a matchup between the era's two best, Fordham lost to Alabama, 7–6, in the second televised college football game. Both games were aired locally by NBC on an experimental New York-based channel called W2XBS that was available to only about 1,000 sets in the New York City area.

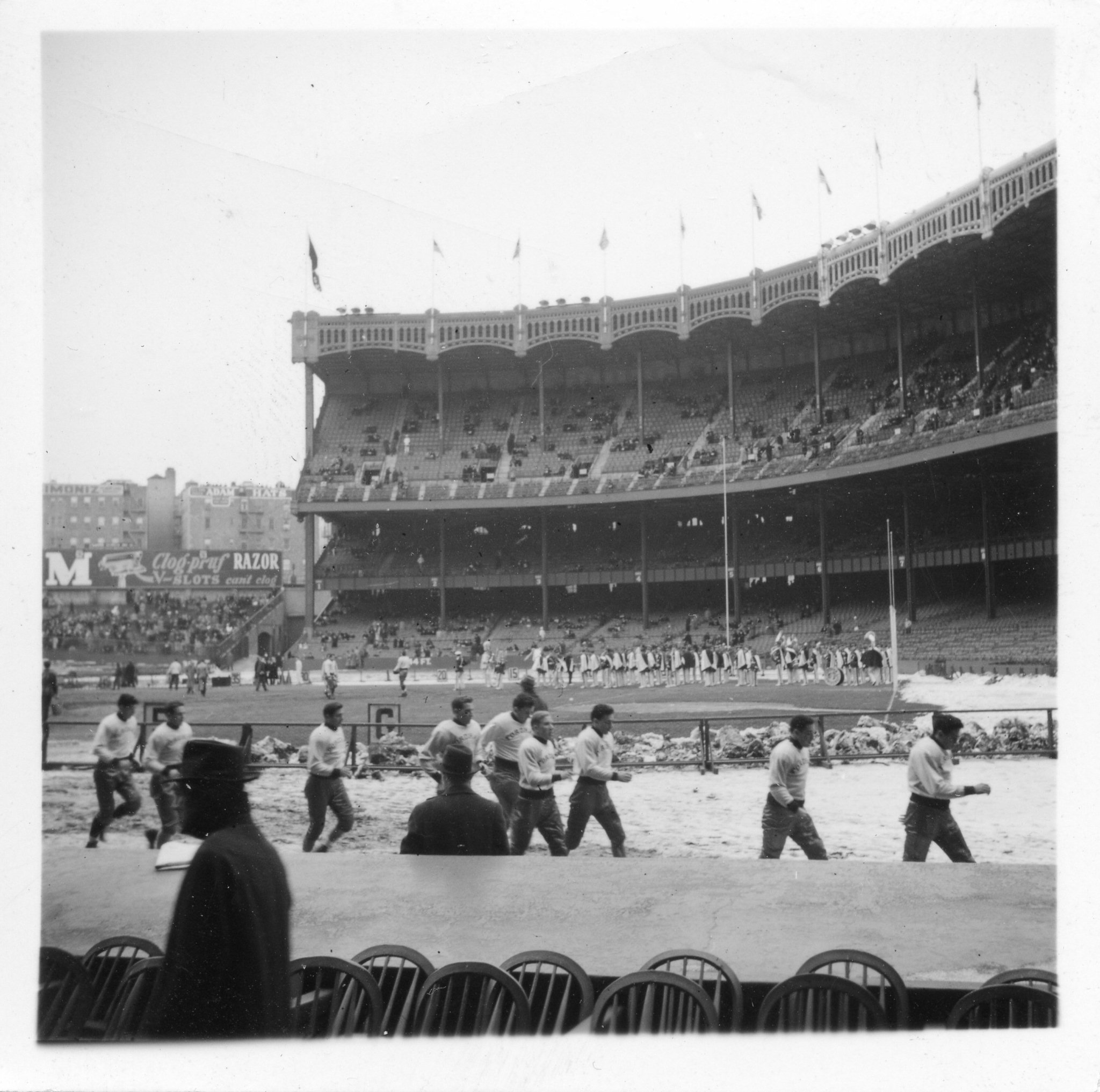
Fordham prepares to take on NYU in Yankee Stadium in front of 35,000

Following the conclusion of World War II, Fordham football returned in 1946 but on a deemphasized basis. National opponents were replaced with a regional schedule and recruiting became more difficult as the school put more emphasis on academics. University president Father Robert Gannon SJ did his best to diminish the program. Claiming that having a top-level football team didn't provide any real benefit to the school Gannon declared, "Fordham does not ever again want a football team rated among the nation's ten heaviest." Gannon further claimed sportswriters were "tyrants of tyrants" who believed universities only existed "to provide them with income." His hope would not be completely fulfilled as, after three straight abysmal seasons, some pre-war greatness reawakened in 1949. Coincidentally, shortly after Gannon's departure from Rose Hill, Fordham jumped to a 4–0 record and was briefly nationally ranked before suffering a 35–0 loss to second-ranked Army. Dubbed the "Donnybrook on the Hudson" the game featured 23 unnecessary roughness penalties and several fistfights as, according to team captain Herb Seidell, "17 teeth came out of nine different mouths." That loss aside, the Rams led the nation in passing and, at 5–3, experienced their first winning record since 1942.

The 1950 team, which boasted wins over San Francisco and Syracuse, finished with an even stronger 8–1 record. During a weak period for the Eastern region as a whole however, Fordham remained unranked and was passed over during the postseason despite getting consideration from both the Orange and Gator Bowls. Early into the 1951 national rankings Fordham did appear in the "others receiving votes" category but were never again a bowl threat. The team combined for an 11–14–1 mark over the next three years although, thanks to the QB platoon of Roger Franz and Vinnie Drake, did again lead the nation in passing in 1952. Franz and Drake (one of the first African American quarterbacks in college football), who were both seniors continued to put up prolific numbers in 1953 despite another losing season. The highlight of the season came in a 20–0 shutout over Miami (FL) on Halloween Day, 1953 in front of 20,000 fans at the Polo Grounds. In 1954, up against a young squad depleted by graduation, the Hurricanes easily handled the rematch. In front of 37,000 Orange Bowl fans, Miami ran roughshod over Fordham, 75–7. It was the Rams' single worst debacle of the 1950s. The team finished the 1954 campaign at 1–7–1 and, with crowds averaging under 12,000 per game while inside the cavernous but deteriorating Polo Grounds, administrators decided to drop the program.

Back on campus and while calling the baseball diamond, Jack Coffey Field, home, students brought football back to Fordham at the club level in 1964. It again became a varsity sport within the small "College Division" in 1970 and was reclassified as a Division III program in 1973. After over a decade of ups and downs the Rams qualified for the 1987 D-III playoffs and reached the quarterfinals before losing to eventual champions, Wagner. Still, the successful 1987 campaign renewed an interest in elevating the program.

35 years after dropping big time football, Fordham finally regained Division I status (at the I-AA level, later renamed FCS) upon moving up in 1989. Initial excitement was diminished as the Rams began a dismal stretch of 12 straight losing seasons. Fortunes finally changed in 2001 with a 7–4 finish under the leadership of head coach Dave Clawson. They changed even more so in 2002 when the Rams won their first ever Patriot League title, reached the quarterfinals of I-AA playoffs, ended 10–3 and earned their first season-ending national ranking (albeit this time at the I-AA level) since 1941. Fordham built on that achievement with another Patriot League title in 2007 and a return to scholarships in 2010. Moving from need-based financial aid to full football scholarships however appeared to give the Rams a competitive advantage over the rest of the Patriot League. After some deliberation Fordham was allowed to continue with its conference schedule although those contests did not officially count in the conference standings. Furthermore, the school was ruled ineligible from any conference titles (and thus an automatic bid into the Division I Football Championship Subdivision playoffs) until 2014 when the rest of the league was also able to switch to mostly scholarship rosters. Still, Fordham qualified into the FCS playoffs as an at-large in 2013. This was followed by a league title in 2014 and another at-large appearance in 2015. Each of those seasons also ended with Top-20 FCS rankings.

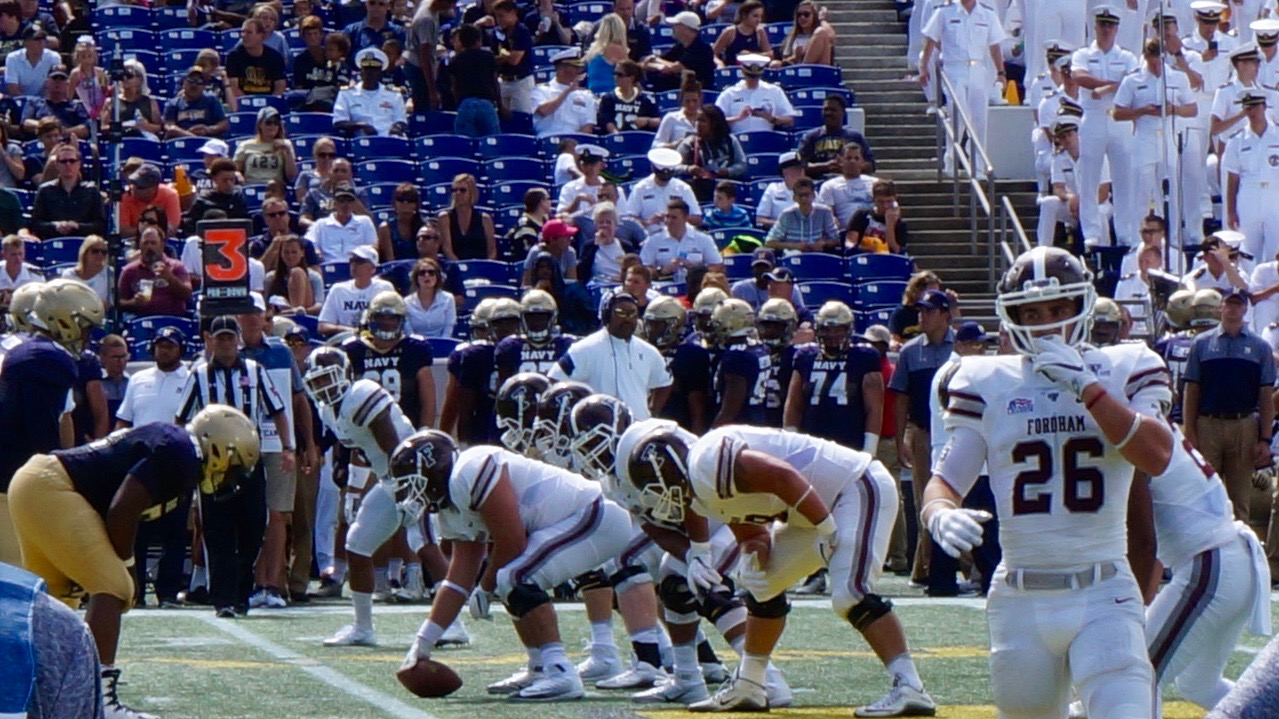
Fordham vs. Navy at Navy–Marine Corps Memorial Stadium, 2016

The move to scholarships not only provided Fordham with a successful FCS run, but also allowed the Rams to add FBS (formerly I-A) programs to their schedule. Higher profile contests against Cincinnati (2012), Navy (2016) and Nebraska (2021) were added and although those games resulted in lopsided losses, Fordham was capable of knocking off weaker FBS teams like Temple (2013), Army (2015) and Buffalo (2023).

Joe Moorhead was the architect of the first two FCS victories, but despite steady modern era success, Fordham is still best known for their "Seven Blocks of Granite." The name was given to the team's 1929/1930 and 1936/1937 offensive lines, often referred to as 'impenetrable'. The 1936 team was coached by "Sleepy" Jim Crowley, one of the famed "Four Horsemen" that contributed to Notre Dame's successes during the early 1920s. Aside from Notre Dame-inspired gold helmets, Crowley also brought an all-Notre Dame staff with him to Rose Hill. This included line coach Frank Leahy, who later returned to South Bend. This also included Vince Lombardi, who later became an NFL head coach for various teams.

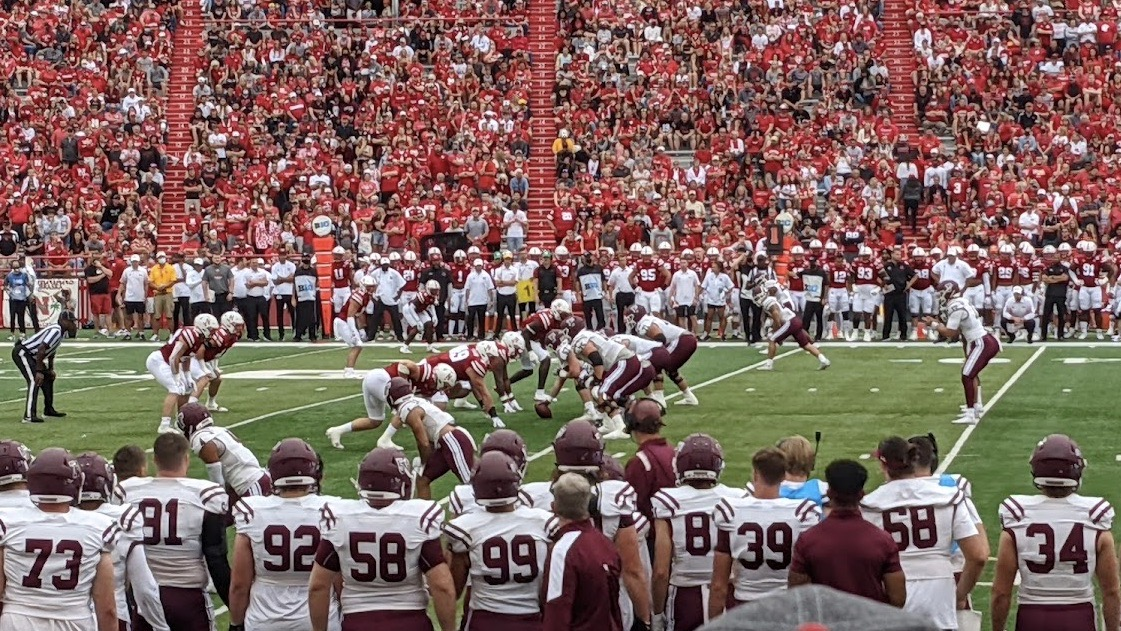
Fordham vs. Nebraska at Memorial Stadium, 2021

Additionally, Fordham is credited with inspiring the term "Ivy League" after New York Herald Tribune sportswriter Caswell Adams compared the Rams to Princeton and Yale, two powerhouses of the day. Adams remarked disparagingly of the latter two that they were "only Ivy League" squads. Up until then what is now called the Ivy League was a loose collection of schools informally known as the Ancient Eight. Ironically, although Fordham shunned most Ivies during their glory years, since moving to the I-AA/FCS ranks in 1989, the bulk of the Rams' out of conference schedule has come against Ivy competition.

Back in the early days of the draft, and again more recently, Fordham has placed many players in the NFL. Their lasting mark on the pro ranks however came in 1936. The Cleveland Rams, a club from a new startup league, the AFL, named themselves the Rams to honor Fordham. The Cleveland team joined the NFL the following season, then in 1946, they moved to Los Angeles. The team moved to St. Louis in 1995 and returned to L.A. in 2016. The Rams remain the only NFL team named after a college one.

=== Classifications (since 1937) ===
- 1937–1954: NCAA (pre-divisional)
- 1955–1963: No team
- 1964–1969: Club team
- 1970–1972: NCAA College Division
- 1973–1988: NCAA Division III
- 1989–present: NCAA Division I–AA/FCS

=== Conference memberships ===
- 1881–1954: Independent
- 1955–1963: no team
- 1964–1969: club team
- 1970–1972: NCAA College Division independent
- 1973–1977: Metropolitan Intercollegiate Conference
- 1978–1984: NCAA Division III independent
- 1985–1988: Liberty Football Conference
- 1989–1989: NCAA Division I-AA independent
- 1990–present: Patriot League

== Notable former football players ==
- Vince Lombardi 1934–1936 (Pro Football Hall of Fame, coach)
- Alex Wojciechowicz 1935–1937 (Pro Football and College Football Hall of Fame)
- Ed Danowski 1931–1933 (All-NFL; 2x Pro Bowl)
- Johnny Dell Isola 1931–1933 (All-NFL)
- Joe Maniaci 1933–1935 (2x Pro Bowl)
- Harry Jacunski 1936–1938 (Pro Bowl)
- Ed Franco 1936–1938 (College Football Hall of Fame)
- Frankie Frisch 1916–1918 (National Baseball Hall of Fame)
- Bulger Lowe 1917
- Len Eshmont 1938–1940
- Al Babartsky 1935–1937
- Steve Filipowicz 1940–1942
- Cary Williams 2004
- Kurt Sohn 1978
- Isa Abdul-Quddus 2007–2010
- Vinnie Yablonski 1942
- John Skelton 2006–2009
- Dom Principe 1937–1939
- Ray Riddick 1937–1939
- Paul Berezney 1936–1938
- Chase Edmonds 2014–2017
- Tad Kornegay 2001–2004 (CFL All-Star)
- Sam Bowers 1978–1979
- Andy Nacrelli 1952–1954
- Dylan Mabin 2015–2018
- Patrick Murray 2009–2013
- Nick Zakelj 2017–2021
- Tim DeMorat 2018–2022
- Kevin Strahle 2004–2008

== Traditions ==
Victory Bell

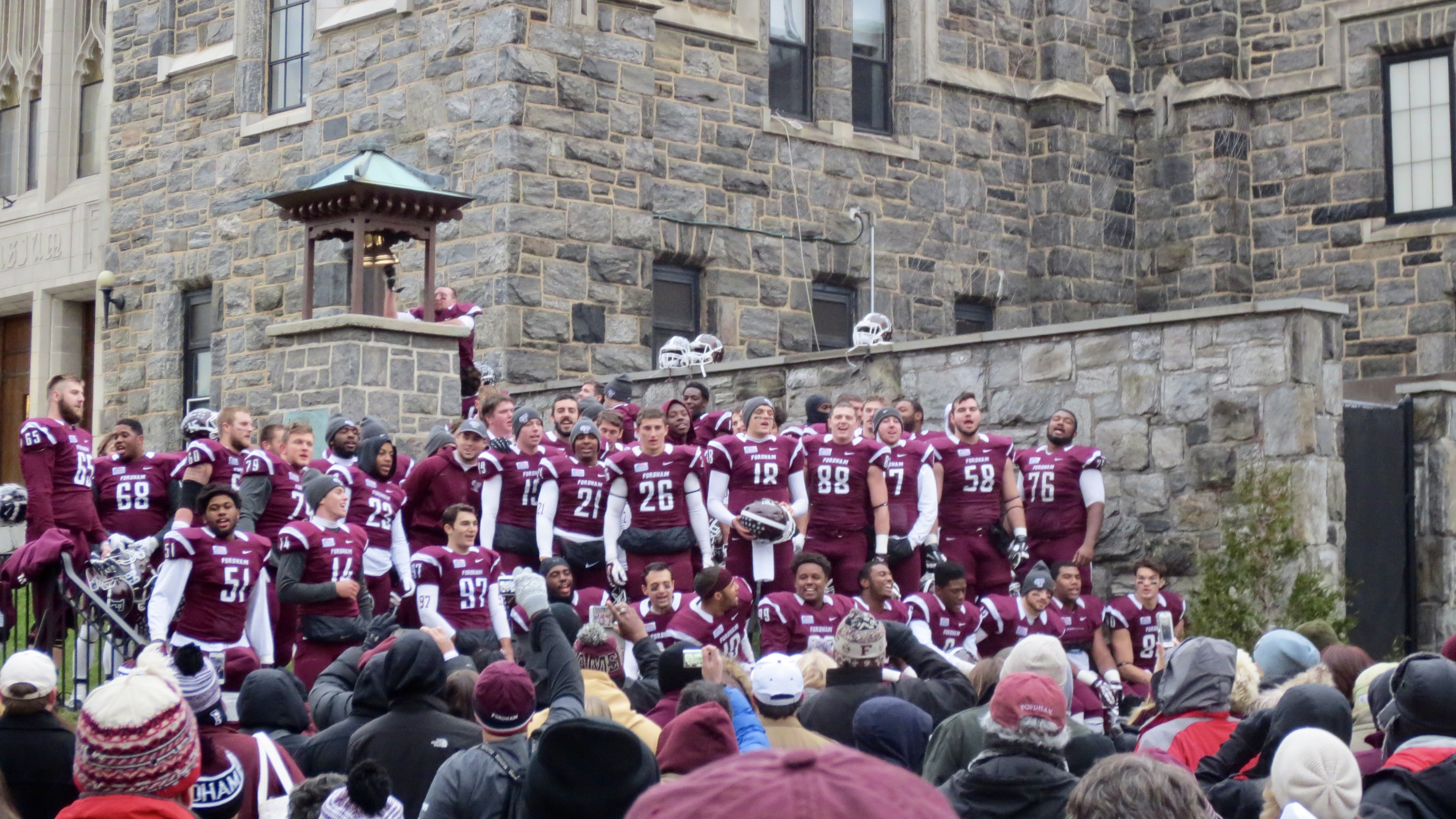
Fordham ringing the Victory Bell in 2014

Since 1946 Fordham wins have been celebrated by ringing the bell which sits just west of Jack Coffey Field and in front of Historic Rose Hill Gymnasium. Originally the bell sat atop the Japanese aircraft carrier Junyō, launched on June 26, 1941. Jun'yō took part in several World War II battles before being torpedoed by three American submarines on December 9, 1944. She made it to a repair dock where she remained through the end of the war. Jun'yō was surrendered to the Allies on September 2, 1945, and scrapped in 1946. Only the bell was salvaged as United States Admiral Chester W. Nimitz presented it to Fordham for the university's wartime sacrifices. Cardinal Francis Spellman blessed the restored bell, and on May 11, 1946, President Harry S. Truman became the first to ring it on campus.

Since then the bell has been rung by senior football players directly after home wins or upon returning to campus following road victories. Underclassmen are required to lift each senior, one at a time, so each can have a turn at ringing the bell. Afterwards the entire team, with the school band playing along, sings Fordham's fight song for gathered fans. Once strictly a football tradition, the bell has been used by other teams for special occasions. Most importantly, the Victory Bell is used to commence graduation ceremonies. In 2021 HeroSports ranked the ringing of the Victory Bell as the 7th best tradition in all of FCS.

== Championships ==
=== National championships ===
Fordham ended the 1929 season as title holders according to college football's lineal "fictitious national championship". That team was also retroactively declared national champions by University of Tennessee physics professor, Soren Sorensen. However, according to a national poll conducted by Albert Russel Erskine, Notre Dame finished as the top ranked team. The Dickinson System, a math formula used at the time to rate college football teams, also gave the 1929 crown to Notre Dame. The Dunkel Index, another math formula, confirmed Notre Dame as the nation's top program. Other later math systems including Sagarin-ELO, Boand, Poling and Billingsley all retroactively backed the real-time assessments, as did Helms, the College Football Researchers Association and the National Championship Foundation.

In fact, according to James Howell's Football Power Ratings (who also listed Notre Dame as 1929 champions), Fordham finished the season rated only 24th. The Rams finished as low as 48th according Sports-Reference (also having Notre Dame at the top spot) but there is no denying that, on the field, Fordham has a lineal claim to the 1929 title. It's a claim that is still occasionally referred to in the media despite the fact that Ram teams generally finished with higher national ranking/ratings throughout the 1930s and early '40s.

Long after those glory years, and as a non-varsity club in 1968, Fordham won a minor national championship. That success helped propel the team back to varsity status in 1970. Fordham also reached the quarterfinals of the 1987 NCAA Division III playoffs. That success helped propel the team over the NCAA Division II level entirely and into what would later be known as the FCS level in 1989. Fordham reached the quarterfinals of the 2002 FCS playoffs but that is the closest they've come to another national championship.

=== Regional championships ===
Fordham won the 1941 Lambert Trophy, an annual award given to the best team in the Northeast. The ECAC awarded the Rams with a similar honor as the Northeast's best FCS team in 2015.

=== Conference championships ===
Aside from brief memberships inside local NCAA Division III conferences (the Metropolitan Intercollegiate Conference in the '70s where the Rams won a league title in 1977 and the Liberty Football Conference in the '80s, where the Rams won league titles in 1987 and 1988) Fordham has spent the bulk of their football existence as an independent. They then joined the Patriot League in 1990 and after over a decade of struggles, finally won conference crowns in 2002, 2007 and 2014. Each title earned the team automatic bids into the NCAA FCS (previously I-AA) playoffs.

=== Postseason play ===
Over 60 years after their last major bowl game, the Rams returned to the NCAA Division I postseason by knocking Northeastern out of the first round of the 2002 I-AA playoffs. A week later they fell to Villanova in the I-AA quarterfinals. Fordham fell to UMass in the first round of the 2007 playoffs. In the 2013 playoffs, Fordham defeated Sacred Heart in the opening round before bowing to Towson in the Round of 16. They again beat Sacred Heart in the 2014 playoffs before losing badly to New Hampshire in the Round of 16. They were soundly defeated by Chattanooga in the opening round of the 2015 playoffs. The Rams did not return to the playoffs until 2022 when they lost an opening round shootout to New Hampshire.

== Bowl games ==
Season	Coach	Bowl	Opponent	Result
1940	Jim Crowley	Cotton Bowl	Texas A&M	L 12–13
1941	Jim Crowley	Sugar Bowl	Missouri	W 2–0

== Playoff appearances ==
=== NCAA Division III ===
The Rams played NCAA Division III football from 1973 to 1988. They made one playoffs appearance and have a record of 1–1 at that level.

Year	Round	Opponent	Result
1987	First Round; Quarterfinals	Hofstra; Wagner	W 41–6; L 0–21

=== NCAA Division I FCS ===
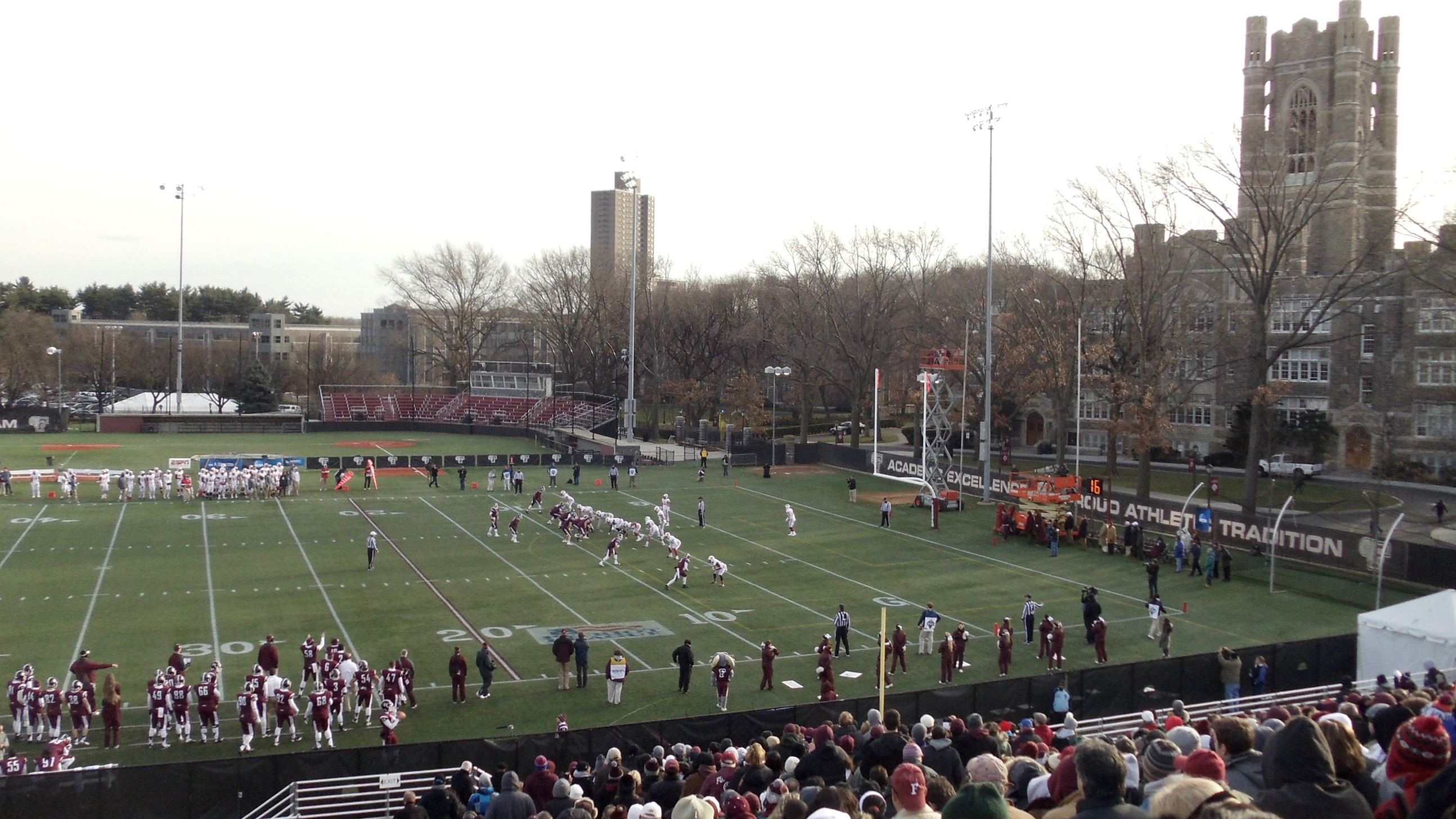
Fordham vs. Sacred Heart at Jack Coffey Field, opening round of playoffs, 2013

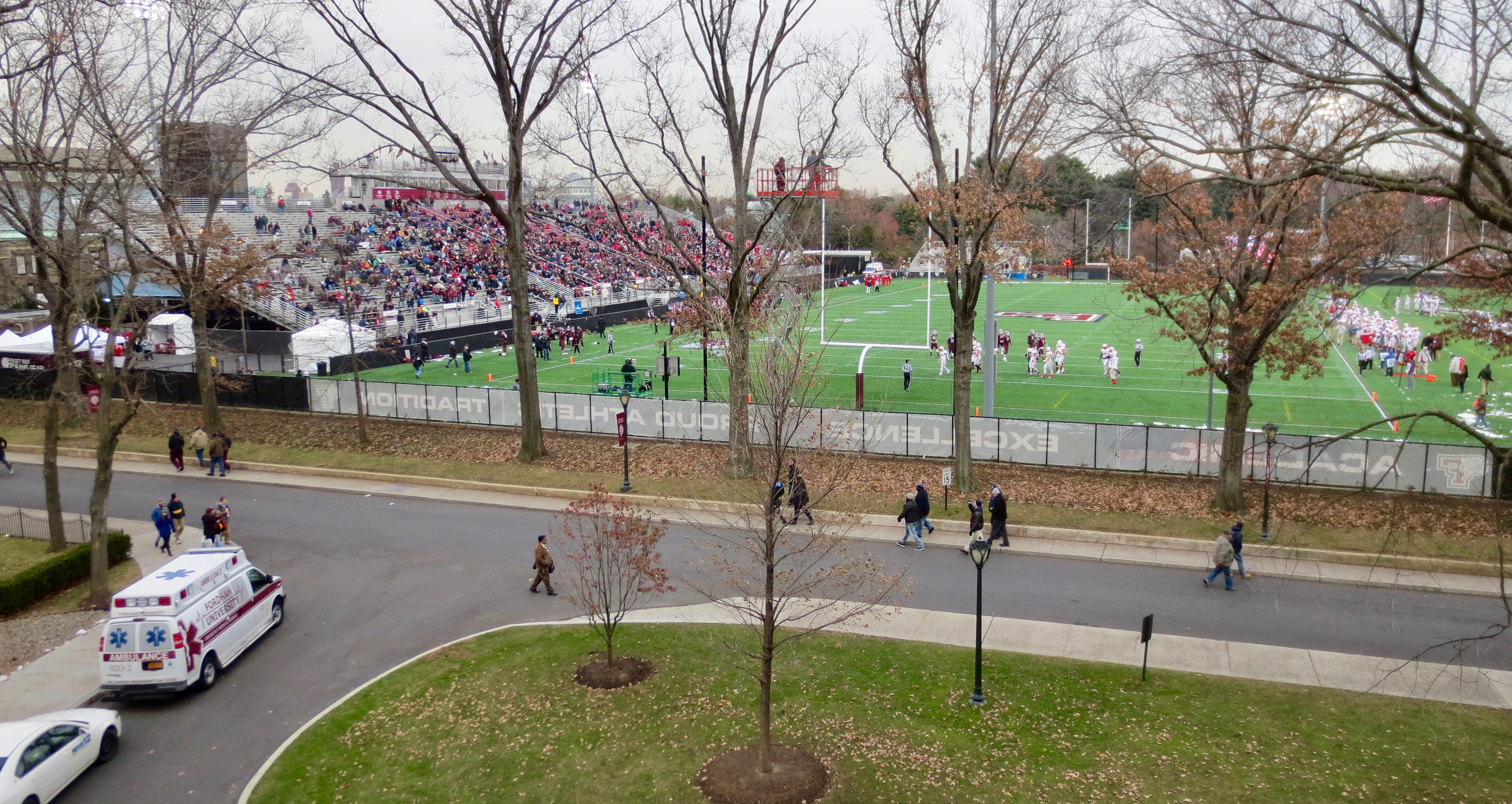
Fordham vs. Sacred Heart at Jack Coffey Field, opening round of playoffs, 2014

The Rams have played in NCAA Division I Football Championship Subdivision (FCS) since 1989. They have made six playoff appearances since and have a record of 3–6 at that level.

Season	Round	Opponent	Result
2002	First Round; Quarterfinals	Northeastern; Villanova	W 29–24; L 10–24
2007	First Round	UMass	L 35–49
2013	First Round; Second Round	Sacred Heart; Towson	W 37–27; L 28–48
2014	First Round; Second Round	Sacred Heart; New Hampshire	W 44–22; L 19–44
2015	First Round	Chattanooga	L 20–50
2022	First Round	New Hampshire	L 42–52

== Rivalries ==
=== Columbia Lions ===
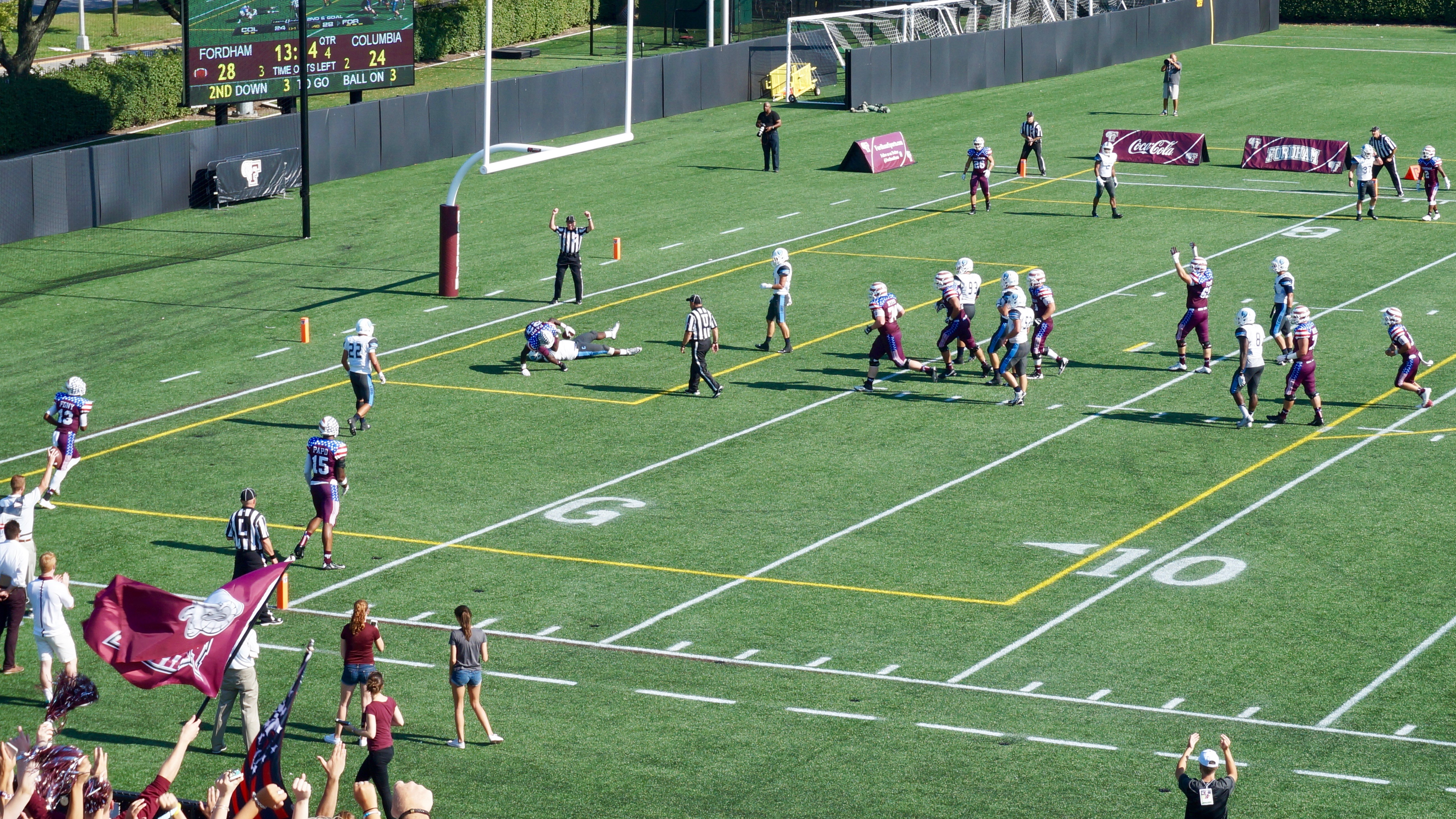
Fordham vs. Columbia at Jack Coffey Field, 2015

The Liberty Cup (on hiatus since 2016) was instituted in 2002 to honor alumni from both Fordham and Columbia University who were lost in the attacks of September 11, 2001. The Cup also honored the thousands of others who lost their lives on September 11. Columbia called off the series before the 2015 season, making that season's encounter (a 44–24 Fordham win), the Cup's last.

The series ended with the Rams holding a 10–4 Liberty Cup lead and victories in the final six meetings. The all-time series dates back to 1890, though in the first 100 years only three games (all Columbia wins) were played. The rivalry was a near annual affair afterwards. The overall record sits tied, 12–12.

=== Holy Cross Crusaders ===
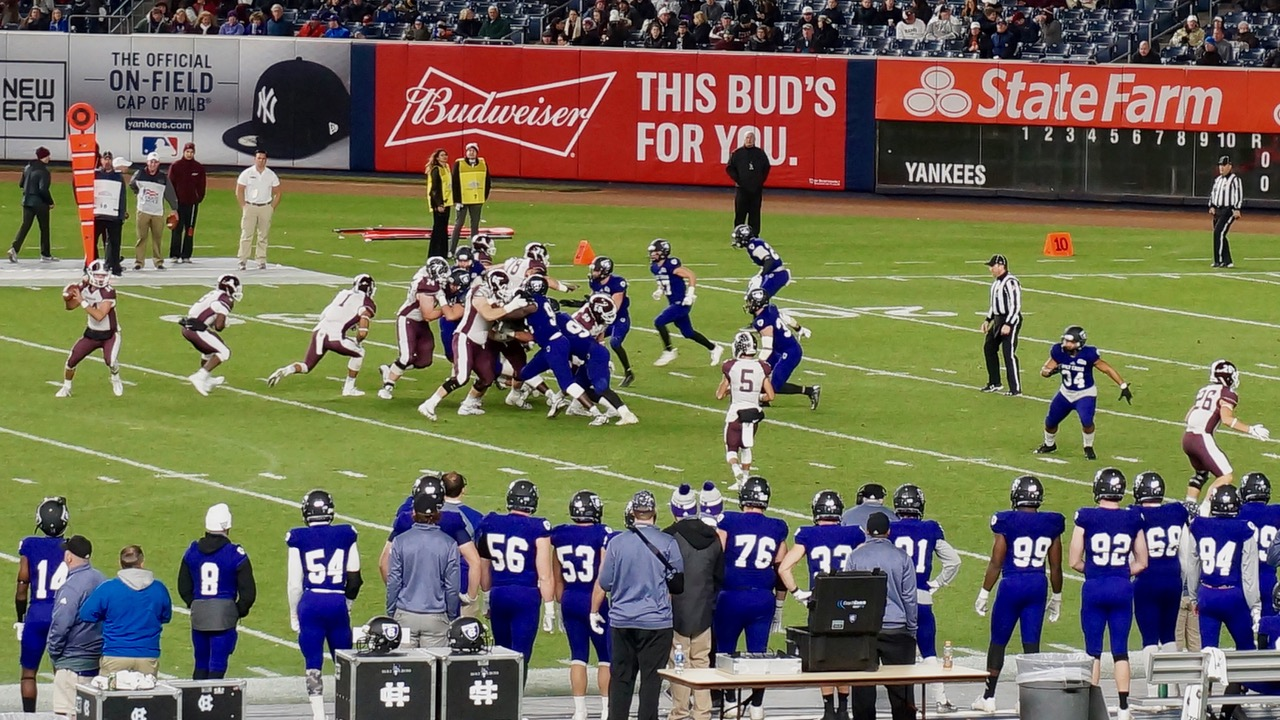
Fordham vs. Holy Cross at Yankee Stadium, 2016

Fordham and Holy Cross first met on the gridiron in 1902. The Ram-Crusader Cup (on hiatus between 1955 and 1989) was instituted in 1951 to honor the memory of Major Frank Cavanaugh. The "Iron Major" spent three seasons as the head coach at Holy Cross (1903–1905) where he built a 19–10–2 record. Decades later he spent six seasons at Fordham (1927–1932) where he compiled a 34–14–4 record and also elevated the program to college football's highest level. Due to health concerns, Major Cavanaugh was relieved of his duties following the 1932 season and died in August 1933.

Holy Cross has won the last seven encounters and leads the "Iron Major" series, 24–15. The all-time series dates back to 1902, just a year before Cavanaugh began patrolling the Holy Cross sideline. The Crusaders also lead the overall series, 35–25–2. The 2016 game was played on November 12, at Yankee Stadium, where in front of over 21,000 fans, Fordham defeated Holy Cross by a score of 54–14. This marked Fordham's first game at the Stadium since 1946 and the first encounter between the schools at a professional venue since 1954. Previous Cups were staged in Ireland (1991) and Bermuda (1995).

== Future non-conference opponents ==
Future non-conference opponents announced as of November 19, 2026.

2027	2028
at Syracuse	at Hawaii
at Missouri State	Central Connecticut
