= Jim Crowley =

American football player and coach (1902–1986)

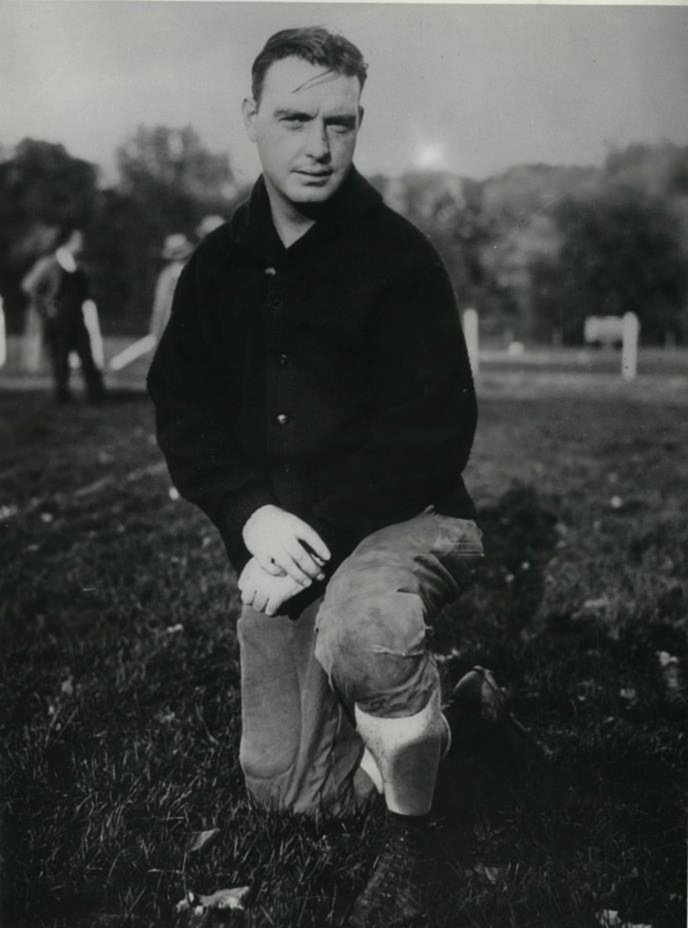
- Crowley in 1933

Biographical details
- Born: September 10, 1902; Chicago, Illinois, U.S.
- Died: January 15, 1986 (aged 83); Scranton, Pennsylvania, U.S.

Playing career
- 1922–1924: Notre Dame
- 1925: Waterbury Blues
- 1925: Green Bay Packers
- 1925: Providence Steam Rollers
- Position: Halfback

Coaching career (HC unless noted)
- 1926–1927: Georgia (assistant)
- 1929–1932: Michigan State
- 1933–1941: Fordham
- 1942: North Carolina Pre-Flight
- 1944: Sampson NTS
- 1947: Chicago Rockets

Head coaching record
- Overall: 88–30–11 (college); 0–10 (AAFC)
- Bowls: 1–1

Accomplishments and honors

Championships
- National (1924)

Awards
- Consensus All-American (1924)
- College Football Hall of Fame; Inducted in 1966 (profile)

James Harold "Sleepy Jim" Crowley (September 10, 1902 – January 15, 1986) was an American football player and coach. He gained fame as one-fourth of the University of Notre Dame's legendary "Four Horsemen" backfield where he played halfback from 1922 to 1924.

After a brief career as a professional football player, Crowley turned to coaching. He served as the head football coach at Michigan State College from 1929 to 1932, at Fordham University from 1933 to 1941 and at the North Carolina Pre-Flight School in 1942, compiling a career college football record of 86–23–11. Crowley also coached the Chicago Rockets of the All-America Football Conference in 1947. He was inducted into the College Football Hall of Fame as a player in 1966.

== Professional playing and college coaching careers ==
Crowley in 1923

Jim Crowley played football and basketball at East High from 1918 to 1921. His high school coach during the 1919 football season was Curly Lambeau.

Following his graduation from Notre Dame in 1925, Crowley played in just three professional football games with the National Football League's Green Bay Packers and Providence Steamrollers. In 1925, the Waterbury Blues signed Crowley, to join ex-Horseman Stuhldreher in the backfield against a team from Adams, Massachusetts. Crowley's regular job at the time was assistant coach at the University of Georgia. The Blues put on a good show by driving to a 34–0 triumph, with Crowley scoring three touchdowns and Stuhldreher booting two field goals and three extra points. Crowley picked up his check after the game and left the team. Crowley stayed in football as an assistant coach at Georgia and was named head coach at Michigan State University, then known as Michigan State College, in 1929. In four seasons, Crowley's Michigan State Spartans went 22–8–3.

Football power Fordham University lured Crowley away from Michigan State in 1933. Crowley enjoyed tremendous success at Fordham by building one of the top defensive teams in the country. The Rams' stout offensive line, coached by future Notre Dame head coach Frank Leahy, was dubbed the "Seven Blocks of Granite." The defense was led by two-time All-American lineman Alex Wojciechowicz, who later starred professionally for the Detroit Lions and was named to the Pro Football Hall of Fame. Another "Block of Granite", Vince Lombardi, would gain fame as a championship coach for the New York Giants and Green Bay Packers.

In 1938, Crowley brings a group of former college players to France for a series of performances to be played in various cities. In the Debut at the Parc des Princes in Paris a crowd of 20,000 attend the victory of "New Yorkers" against the "All Stars" 25–14.

In 1939, Crowley coached Fordham in the first-ever televised football game. The Rams defeated the Waynesburg Yellow Jackets by a score of 34–7.

Crowley's last two teams at Fordham each went to bowl games. The Rams lost, 13–12, to Texas A&M in the 1941 Cotton Bowl Classic and defeated the Missouri, 2–0, in the 1942 Sugar Bowl. Crowley left Fordham after the Sugar Bowl, having compiled a record of 56–13–7 as the Rams' head coach.

== World War II and the AAFC ==
During World War II, Crowley served with the United States Navy in the South Pacific. In 1942, he served as the head coach for the North Carolina Pre-Flight School team and led the Cloudbusters to an overall record of 8–2–1. In late 1944, he agreed to become the first commissioner of a new professional football league, the All-America Football Conference. The league kicked off in 1946 and quickly became a formidable rival to the National Football League.

Following the 1946 season, Crowley stepped down as commissioner to become part-owner and coach of the AAFC's worst team, the Chicago Rockets. Crowley's success as a college coach didn't translate to the pros. The Rockets went just 1–13 in 1947 and Crowley quit his dual role with the team before the 1948 season.

== Later life ==
Crowley left football behind following his disastrous stint with Chicago, moving to Pennsylvania to become an insurance salesman. In 1953, he moved to Scranton, Pennsylvania, to take over as station manager and sports director of independent television station WTVU. Two years later, Crowley was named chairman of the Pennsylvania State Athletic Commission, a position he held until 1963.

Named to the College Football Hall of Fame in 1966 as a player, Crowley cashed in on his football fame in the 1960s and 1970s as a much sought-after speaker at banquets and dinners. The last living member of the "Four Horsemen," Crowley died in Scranton on January 15, 1986.

== Head coaching record ==
=== College ===
Year	Team	Overall	Conference	Standing	Bowl/playoffs	AP^{#}
Michigan State Spartans (Independent) (1929–1932)
1929	Michigan State	5–3				
1930	Michigan State	5–1–2				
1931	Michigan State	5–3–1				
1932	Michigan State	7–1				
Michigan State:		22–8–3				
Fordham Rams (Independent) (1933–1941)
1933	Fordham	6–2				
1934	Fordham	5–3				
1935	Fordham	6–1–2				
1936	Fordham	5–1–2				15
1937	Fordham	7–0–1				3
1938	Fordham	6–1–2				15
1939	Fordham	6–2				17
1940	Fordham	7–2			L Cotton	12
1941	Fordham	8–1			W Sugar	6
Fordham:		56–13–7				
North Carolina Pre-Flight Cloudbusters (Independent) (1942)
1942	North Carolina Pre-Flight	8–2–1				
North Carolina Pre-Flight:		8–2–1				
Sampson Naval Training Station Bluejackets (Independent) (1944)
1944	Sampson NTS	2–7				
Sampson NTS:		2–7				
Total:		88–30–11				
^{#}Rankings from final AP Poll.
