= 1940 TCU Horned Frogs football team =

American college football season

1940 TCU Horned Frogs football
- Conference: Southwest Conference
- Record: 3–7 (2–4 SWC)
- Head coach: Dutch Meyer (7th season)
- Offensive scheme: Meyer spread
- Home stadium: Amon G. Carter Stadium

1940 Southwest Conference football standings
	Conf.					Overall
Team	W		L		T	W		L		T
No. 6 Texas A&M $	5	–	1	–	0	9	–	1	–	0
No. 16 SMU	5	–	1	–	0	8	–	1	–	1
Texas	4	–	2	–	0	8	–	2	–	0
Rice	4	–	2	–	0	7	–	3	–	0
TCU	2	–	4	–	0	3	–	7	–	0
Arkansas	1	–	5	–	0	4	–	6	–	0
Baylor	0	–	6	–	0	4	–	6	–	0
$ – Conference champion; Rankings from AP Poll

The 1940 TCU Horned Frogs football team represented Texas Christian University (TCU) in the 1940 college football season. The Horned Frogs finished the season 3–7 overall and 2–4 in the Southwest Conference. The team was coached by Dutch Meyer in his seventh year as head coach.

TCU was ranked at No. 42 (out of 697 college football teams) in the final rankings under the Litkenhous Difference by Score system for 1940.

The Frogs played their home games in Amon G. Carter Stadium, which is located on campus in Fort Worth, Texas.

== Schedule ==
Date	Opponent	Site	Result	Attendance	Source
September 28	Centenary*	Amon G. Carter Stadium; Fort Worth, TX	W 41–6	8,000	
October 5	Arkansas	Amon G. Carter Stadium; Fort Worth, TX	W 20–0		
October 12	at North Carolina*	Kenan Memorial Stadium; Chapel Hill, NC	L 14–21	19,000	
October 19	at No. 2 Texas A&M	Kyle Field; College Station, TX (rivalry)	L 7–21	22,000	
October 26	at Tulsa*	Skelly Field; Tulsa, OK	L 0–7	11,000	
November 2	Baylor	Amon G. Carter Stadium; Fort Worth, TX (rivalry)	W 14–12	8,000	
November 9	at Detroit*	University of Detroit Stadium; Detroit, MI	L 0–3	12,352	
November 16	Texas	Amon G. Carter Stadium; Fort Worth, TX (rivalry)	L 14–21	15,000	
November 23	at Rice	Rice Field; Houston, TX	L 6–14		
November 30	at SMU	Ownby Stadium; University Park, TX (rivalry)	L 0–16	13,000	
*Non-conference game; Rankings from AP Poll released prior to the game
