= Al Babartsky =

American football player (1915–2002)

No. 18, 46
- Position: Offensive tackle

Personal information
- Born: April 19, 1915; Shenandoah, Pennsylvania, U.S.
- Died: December 29, 2002 (aged 87); Kettering, Ohio, U.S.
- Listed height: 6 ft 0 in (1.83 m)
- Listed weight: 225 lb (102 kg)

Career information
- High school: Shenandoah (PA) Valley
- College: Fordham (1934-1937)
- NFL draft: 1938: 5th round, 35th overall pick

Career history

Playing
- Chicago Cardinals (1938–1941); Chicago Bears (1943–1945)

Coaching
- Chicago Rockets (1947) Line coach

Awards and highlights
- NFL champion (1943); First-team All-American (1937)

Career NFL statistics
- Games played: 54
- Games started: 37
- Stats at Pro Football Reference

Albert John Babartsky (April 19, 1915 – December 29, 2002) was an American professional football player who was an offensive tackle for six seasons in the National Football League (NFL) with the Chicago Cardinals and the Chicago Bears. He was selected in the fifth round of the 1938 NFL draft. He was a member of the Seven Blocks of Granite at Fordham University.
