= 1940 Baylor Bears football team =

American college football season

1940 Baylor Bears football
- Conference: Southwest Conference
- Record: 4–6 (0–6 SWC)
- Head coach: Morley Jennings (15th season)
- Captains: Robert C. Nelson; Milton S. Merka
- Home stadium: Waco Stadium

1940 Southwest Conference football standings
	Conf.					Overall
Team	W		L		T	W		L		T
No. 6 Texas A&M $	5	–	1	–	0	9	–	1	–	0
No. 16 SMU	5	–	1	–	0	8	–	1	–	1
Texas	4	–	2	–	0	8	–	2	–	0
Rice	4	–	2	–	0	7	–	3	–	0
TCU	2	–	4	–	0	3	–	7	–	0
Arkansas	1	–	5	–	0	4	–	6	–	0
Baylor	0	–	6	–	0	4	–	6	–	0
$ – Conference champion; Rankings from AP Poll

The 1940 Baylor Bears football team represented Baylor University in the Southwest Conference (SWC) during the 1940 college football season. In their 15th and final season under head coach Morley Jennings, the Bears compiled a 4–6 record (0–6 against conference opponents), finished in last place in the conference, and were outscored by opponents by a combined total of 114 to 109. Robert C. Nelson and Milton S. Merka were the team captains.

Baylor was ranked at No. 39 (out of 697 college football teams) in the final rankings under the Litkenhous Difference by Score system for 1940.

They played their home games at Waco Stadium in Waco, Texas.

== Schedule ==
Date	Opponent	Site	Result	Attendance	Source
September 28	North Texas State Teachers*	Waco Stadium; Waco, TX	W 27–20		
October 4	at Denver*	DU Stadium; Denver, CO	W 14–7	16,000	
October 12	at Arkansas	Bailey Stadium; Fayetteville, AR	L 6–12	6,500	
October 19	vs. Villanova*	Alamo Stadium; San Antonio, TX	W 7–0	13,000	
October 26	No. 4 Texas A&M^{†}	Waco Stadium; Waco, TX (rivalry)	L 7–14	20,000	
November 2	at TCU	Amon G. Carter Stadium; Fort Worth, TX (rivalry)	L 12–14	8,000	
November 9	at Texas	Memorial Stadium; Austin, TX (rivalry)	L 0–13	15,000	
November 16	Tulsa*	Waco Stadium; Waco, TX	W 20–6	4,000	
November 23	No. 18 SMU	Waco Stadium; Waco, TX	L 4–7		
November 30	at Rice	Rice Field; Houston, TX	L 12–21		
*Non-conference game; ^{†}Homecoming; Rankings from AP Poll released prior to the game
