= Seven Blocks of Granite =

1920s and 1930s Fordham University football line

The Seven Blocks of Granite were the Fordham University football team's offensive line under head coach "Sleepy" Jim Crowley and line coach Glen Carberry Frank Leahy. The individuals identified among the Seven Blocks of Granite were Leo Paquin, Johnny Druze, Alex Wojciechowicz, Ed Franco, Al Babartsky, Mike Kochel, Harry Jacunski, Natty Pierce, and Vince Lombardi. The nickname was also commonly used to referred to the Fordham lines of 1929, 1930, and 1937, but it is the 1936 line which is the best known.

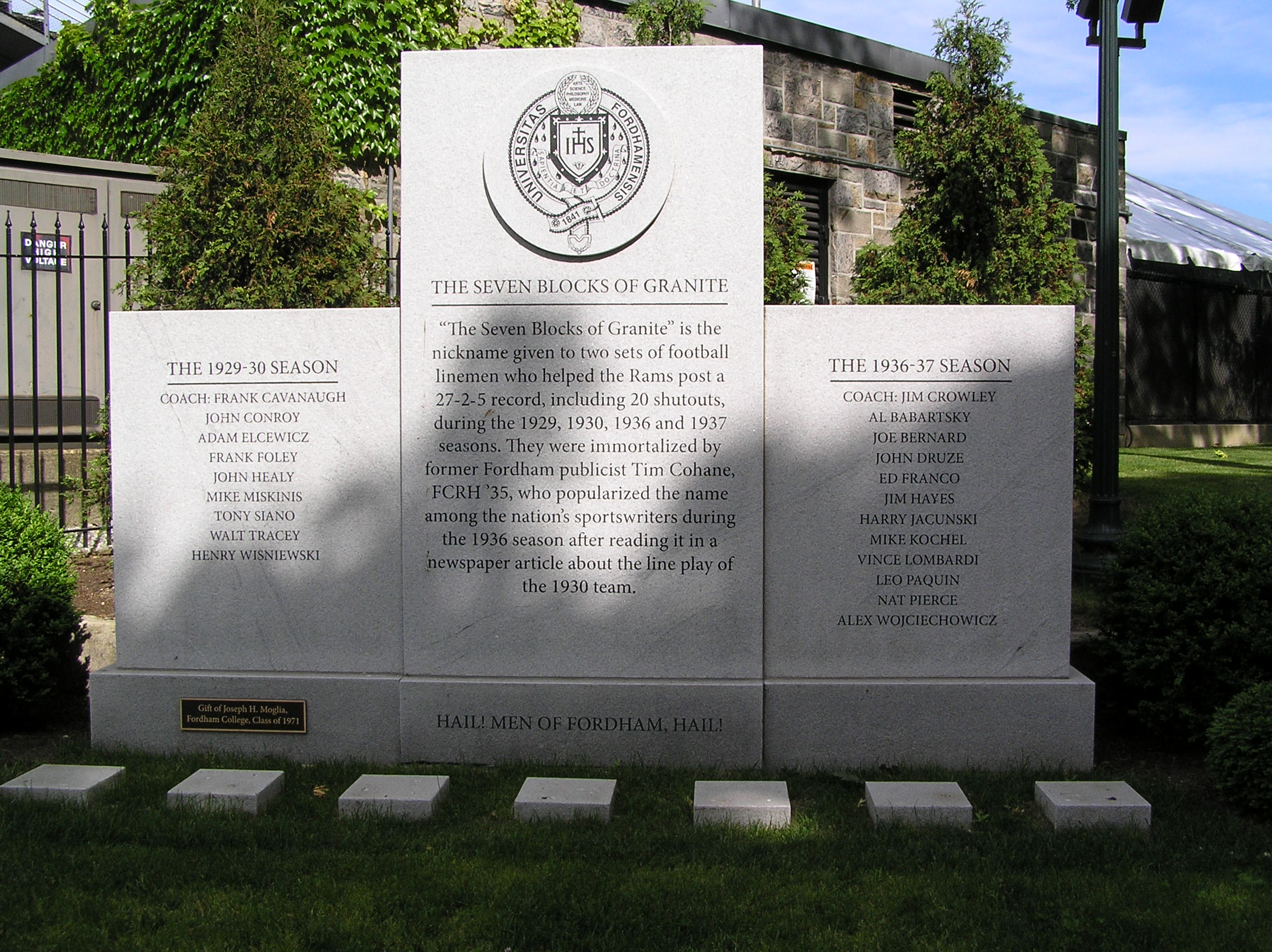
The Seven Blocks of Granite Monument at Fordham University

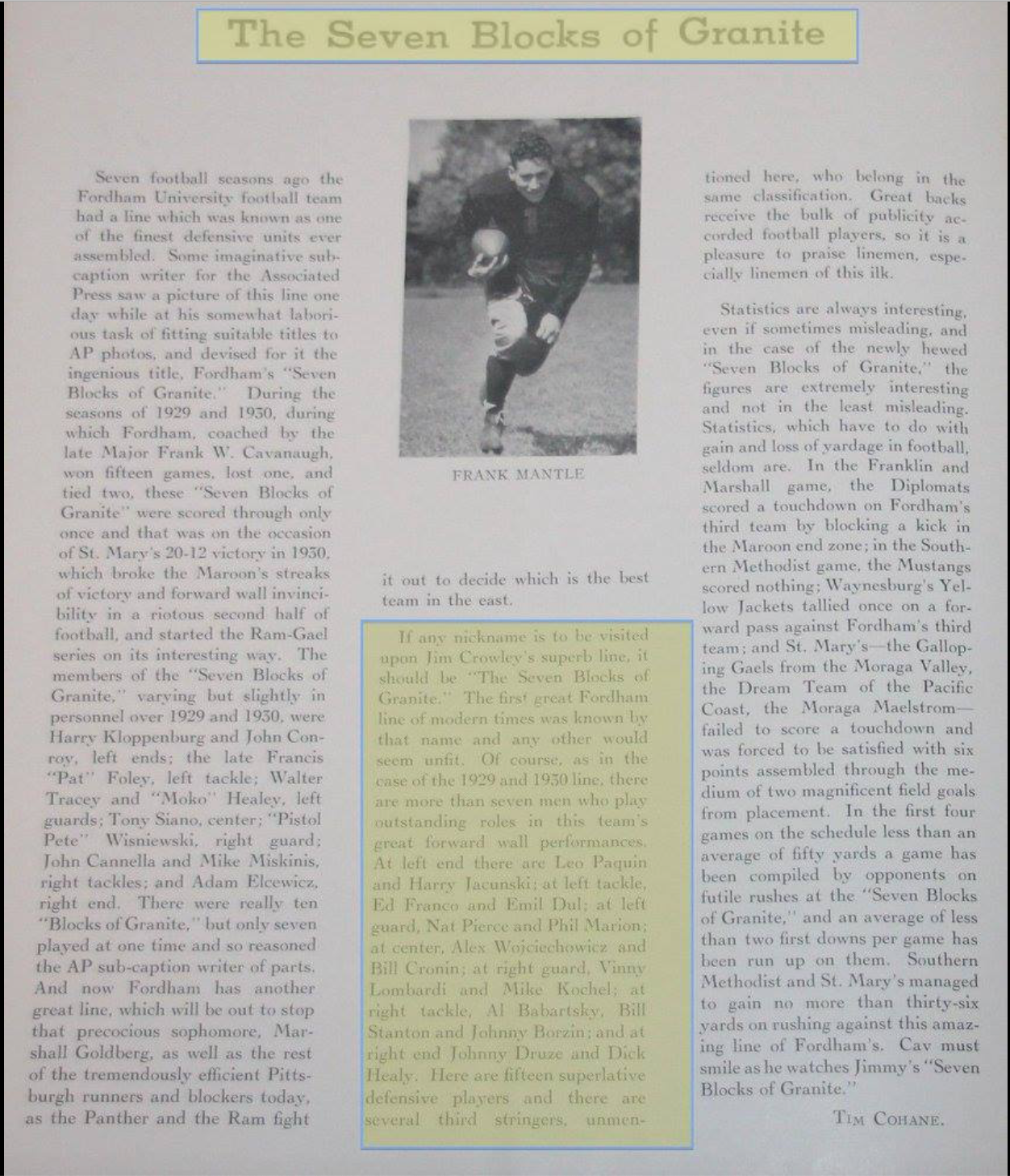

== History ==
In the 1930s, Fordham University was a college football power, consistently a nationally ranked team. In 1936, school publicist Timothy Cohane needed a nickname to spur recognition of his Fordham Rams, who were undefeated halfway through the season, on the verge of possibly their best season ever. The strength of Fordham was its seven-man offensive line: a center, two guards, two tackles, and two ends. In his columns, sportswriter Grantland Rice had already written "The Fordham Wall Still Stands" in honor of the team and its early season success, but a catchy nickname was still needed—something to rival Notre Dame's famous Four Horsemen of 1924. In the previous season, Cohane tried using the "Seven Samsons" to highlight the squad's offensive linemen, but it never caught on; he then tried the "Seven Blocks of Granite".

In its final two games in 1936, Fordham was tied by an inferior Georgia team at the Polo Grounds and beaten by a point by the lowly NYU Violets at Yankee Stadium, ending the Rams' hopes of a Rose Bowl appearance. The line was not as dominant as previous ones at Fordham, or the 1937 team which went 7–0–1, but the 1936 team and the Seven Blocks of Granite became college football immortals.

Associated with the name, the Rotary Club's Lombardi Award is awarded annually to the best college football lineman or linebacker. The main part of the trophy, awarded to a down lineman on either side of the ball or a linebacker who lines up no further than five yards deep from the ball, is a block of granite, giving homage to Lombardi's college days as a lineman.

The last surviving member, John Druze, died in 2005. An on-campus monument to the Seven Blocks of Granite was dedicated in October 2008; it is located on Constitution Row, near the west end of the grandstand of Coffey Field.
