= 1940 Rice Owls football team =

American college football season

1940 Rice Owls football
- Conference: Southwest Conference
- Record: 7–3 (4–2 SWC)
- Head coach: Jess Neely (1st season)
- Home stadium: Rice Field

1940 Southwest Conference football standings
	Conf.					Overall
Team	W		L		T	W		L		T
No. 6 Texas A&M $	5	–	1	–	0	9	–	1	–	0
No. 16 SMU	5	–	1	–	0	8	–	1	–	1
Texas	4	–	2	–	0	8	–	2	–	0
Rice	4	–	2	–	0	7	–	3	–	0
TCU	2	–	4	–	0	3	–	7	–	0
Arkansas	1	–	5	–	0	4	–	6	–	0
Baylor	0	–	6	–	0	4	–	6	–	0
$ – Conference champion; Rankings from AP Poll

The 1940 Rice Owls football team was an American football team that represented Rice Institute as a member of the Southwest Conference (SWC) during the 1940 college football season. In its first season under head coach Jess Neely, the team compiled a 7–3 record (4–2 against SWC opponents) and outscored opponents by a total of 131 to 78.

Rice was ranked at No. 21 (out of 697 college football teams) in the final rankings under the Litkenhous Difference by Score system for 1940.

== Schedule ==
Date	Opponent	Site	Result	Attendance	Source
October 5	Centenary*	Rice Field; Houston, TX	W 25–0		
October 12	LSU*	Rice Field; Houston, TX	W 23–0	23,000	
October 19	at Tulane*	Tulane Stadium; New Orleans, LA	L 6–15	34,000	
October 26	No. 12 Texas	Rice Field; Houston, TX (rivalry)	W 13–0		
November 2	Texas A&I*	Rice Field; Houston, TX	W 9–6		
November 9	at Arkansas	Bailey Stadium; Fayetteville, AR	W 14–7	7,000	
November 16	at No. 3 Texas A&M	Kyle Field; College Station, TX	L 0–25	30,000	
November 23	TCU	Rice Field; Houston, TX	W 14–6		
November 30	Baylor	Rice Field; Houston, TX	W 21–12		
December 7	No. 16 SMU	Rice Field; Houston, TX (rivalry)	L 6–7	22,000	
*Non-conference game; Rankings from AP Poll released prior to the game
