= 1940 Arkansas Razorbacks football team =

American college football season

1940 Arkansas Razorbacks football
- Conference: Southwest Conference
- Record: 4–6 (1–5 SWC)
- Head coach: Fred Thomsen (12th season)
- Captains: A. J. Yates; Red Hickey
- Home stadium: Bailey Stadium

1940 Southwest Conference football standings
	Conf.					Overall
Team	W		L		T	W		L		T
No. 6 Texas A&M $	5	–	1	–	0	9	–	1	–	0
No. 16 SMU	5	–	1	–	0	8	–	1	–	1
Texas	4	–	2	–	0	8	–	2	–	0
Rice	4	–	2	–	0	7	–	3	–	0
TCU	2	–	4	–	0	3	–	7	–	0
Arkansas	1	–	5	–	0	4	–	6	–	0
Baylor	0	–	6	–	0	4	–	6	–	0
$ – Conference champion; Rankings from AP Poll

The 1940 Arkansas Razorbacks football team represented the University of Arkansas in the Southwest Conference (SWC) during the 1940 college football season. In their 12th under head coach Fred Thomsen, the Razorbacks compiled a 4–6 record (1–5 against SWC opponents), finished in sixth place in the SWC, and were outscored by their opponents by a combined total of 174 to 112.

Arkansas was ranked at No. 67 (out of 697 college football teams) in the final rankings under the Litkenhous Difference by Score system for 1940.

== Schedule ==
Date	Opponent	Site	Result	Attendance	Source
September 28	Central State (OK)*	Bailey Stadium; Fayetteville, AR	W 38–0		
October 5	at TCU	Amon G. Carter Stadium; Fort Worth, TX	L 0–20		
October 12	Baylor	Bailey Stadium; Fayetteville, AR	W 12–6	6,500	
October 19	No. 14 Texas	Quigley Stadium; Little Rock, AR (rivalry)	L 0–21	11,000	
October 26	vs. No. 14 Ole Miss*	Crump Stadium; Memphis, TN (rivalry)	W 21–20	15,000	
November 2	at No. 5 Texas A&M	Kyle Field; College Station, TX (rivalry)	L 0–17		
November 9	Rice^{†}	Bailey Stadium; Fayetteville, AR	L 7–14	7,000	
November 16	at No. 20 SMU	Ownby Stadium; University Park, TX	L 0–28		
November 21	at No. 15 Fordham*	Polo Grounds; New York, NY	L 7–27	16,500	
November 28	at Tulsa*	Skelly Field; Tulsa, OK	W 27–21	15,000	
*Non-conference game; ^{†}Homecoming; Rankings from AP Poll released prior to the game
