= 1940 SMU Mustangs football team =

American college football season

1940 SMU Mustangs football

SWC co-champion
- Conference: Southwest Conference

Ranking
- AP: No. 16
- Record: 8–1–1 (5–1 SWC)
- Head coach: Matty Bell (6th season)
- Captains: Will Mullinweg; Raymond Pope
- Home stadium: Ownby Stadium

1940 Southwest Conference football standings
	Conf.					Overall
Team	W		L		T	W		L		T
No. 6 Texas A&M $	5	–	1	–	0	9	–	1	–	0
No. 16 SMU	5	–	1	–	0	8	–	1	–	1
Texas	4	–	2	–	0	8	–	2	–	0
Rice	4	–	2	–	0	7	–	3	–	0
TCU	2	–	4	–	0	3	–	7	–	0
Arkansas	1	–	5	–	0	4	–	6	–	0
Baylor	0	–	6	–	0	4	–	6	–	0
$ – Conference champion; Rankings from AP Poll

The 1940 SMU Mustangs football team was an American football team that represented Southern Methodist University (SMU) in the Southwest Conference (SWC) during the 1940 college football season. In their sixth season under head coach Matty Bell, the Mustangs compiled an 8–1–1 record (5–1 against conference opponents), tied for the SWC championship, outscored opponents by a total of 142 to 75, and was ranked No. 16 in the final AP Poll.

Fullback Preston Johnson was selected by both the Associated Press (AP) and the United Press as a first-team player on their 1940 All-Southwest Conference football teams. Tackle Joe Pasqua was named to the second team by the AP. Will Mullinweg and Raymond Pope were the team captains.

== Schedule ==
Date	Opponent	Rank	Site	Result	Attendance	Source
September 29	at UCLA*		Los Angeles Memorial Coliseum; Los Angeles, CA	W 9–6	70,000	
October 5	North Texas State Teachers*		Ownby Stadium; University Park, TX (rivalry)	W 20–7		
October 12	at Pittsburgh*		Pitt Stadium; Pittsburgh, PA	T 7–7	39,000	
October 19	Auburn*		Ownby Stadium; University Park, TX	W 20–13	10,000	
November 2	at Texas	No. 15	War Memorial Stadium; Austin, TX	W 21–13	25,000	
November 9	No. 4 Texas A&M	No. 14	Ownby Stadium; University Park, TX	L 7–19	27,000	
November 16	Arkansas	No. 20	Ownby Stadium; University Park, TX	W 28–0		
November 23	at Baylor	No. 18	Waco Stadium; Waco, TX	W 7–4		
November 30	TCU	No. 16	Ownby Stadium; University Park, TX (rivalry)	W 16–0	13,000	
December 7	at Rice	No. 16	Rice Field; Houston, TX (rivalry)	W 7–6	22,000	
*Non-conference game; Rankings from AP Poll released prior to the game

== Rankings ==
Ranking movements Legend: ██ Increase in ranking ██ Decrease in ranking — = Not ranked т = Tied with team above or below
	Week							
Poll	1	2	3	4	5	6	7	Final
AP	—	19	15т	14	20т	18	16	16
