= 1940 Texas Longhorns football team =

American college football season

1940 Texas Longhorns football
- Conference: Southwest Conference
- Record: 8–2 (4–2 SWC)
- Head coach: Dana X. Bible (4th season)
- Captains: Ted Dawson; Jimmy Grubbs
- Home stadium: War Memorial Stadium

1940 Southwest Conference football standings
| | Conf. | | | | | Overall |
| Team | W | | L | | T | W | | L | | T |
|---|---|---|---|---|---|---|---|---|---|---|
| No. 6 Texas A&M $ | 5 | – | 1 | – | 0 | 9 | – | 1 | – | 0 |
| No. 16 SMU | 5 | – | 1 | – | 0 | 8 | – | 1 | – | 1 |
| Texas | 4 | – | 2 | – | 0 | 8 | – | 2 | – | 0 |
| Rice | 4 | – | 2 | – | 0 | 7 | – | 3 | – | 0 |
| TCU | 2 | – | 4 | – | 0 | 3 | – | 7 | – | 0 |
| Arkansas | 1 | – | 5 | – | 0 | 4 | – | 6 | – | 0 |
| Baylor | 0 | – | 6 | – | 0 | 4 | – | 6 | – | 0 |
$ – Conference champion; Rankings from AP Poll

The 1940 Texas Longhorns football team was an American football team that represented the University of Texas (now known as the University of Texas at Austin) as a member of the Southwest Conference (SWC) during the 1940 college football season. In their fourth year under head coach Dana X. Bible, the Longhorns compiled an overall record of 8–2, with a mark of 4–2 in conference play, and finished tied for third in the SWC.

Texas was ranked at No. 13 (out of 697 college football teams) in the final rankings under the Litkenhous Difference by Score system for 1940.

== Schedule ==
| Date | Opponent | Rank | Site | Result | Attendance | Source |
|---|---|---|---|---|---|---|
| September 28 | Colorado* | | War Memorial Stadium; Austin, TX | W 39–7 | | |
| October 5 | at Indiana* | | Memorial Stadium; Bloomington, IN | W 13–6 | 17,000 | |
| October 12 | vs. Oklahoma* | | Cotton Bowl; Dallas, TX (rivalry) | W 19–16 | 35,000 | |
| October 19 | at Arkansas | No. 14 | Quigley Stadium; Little Rock, AR (rivalry) | W 21–0 | 11,000 | |
| October 26 | at Rice | No. 12 | Rice Field; Houston, TX (rivalry) | L 0–13 | | |
| November 2 | No. 15 SMU | | War Memorial Stadium; Austin, TX | L 13–21 | 25,000 | |
| November 9 | Baylor | | War Memorial Stadium; Austin, TX (rivalry) | W 13–0 | 15,000 | |
| November 16 | at TCU | | Amon G. Carter Stadium; Fort Worth, TX (rivalry) | W 21–14 | 15,000 | |
| November 28 | No. 2 Texas A&M | | War Memorial Stadium; Austin, TX (rivalry) | W 7–0 | 45,000 | |
| December 7 | at Florida* | | Florida Field; Gainesville, FL | W 26–0 | 12,000 | |
*Non-conference game; Rankings from AP Poll released prior to the game

== Rankings ==
Ranking movements Legend: ██ Increase in ranking ██ Decrease in ranking — = Not ranked
| | Week | | | | | | | |
| Poll | 1 | 2 | 3 | 4 | 5 | 6 | 7 | Final |
|---|---|---|---|---|---|---|---|---|
| AP | 14 | 12 | — | — | — | — | — | — |
