= Shenandoah Valley Junior Senior High School =

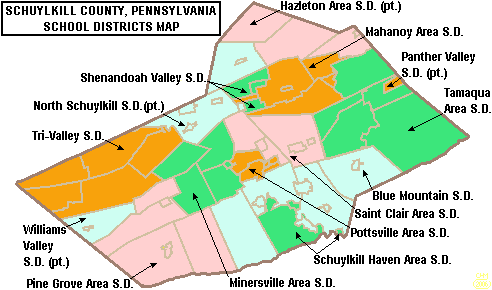
- Map of school districts in Schuylkill County, Pennsylvania

Location
- 805 West Centre Street; Shenandoah, Schuylkill County, Pennsylvania 17976-1441; United States; 40.8195°N 76.2114°W

Information
- Type: Public
- Principal: Stuart Tripler
- Grades: 7–12
- Enrollment: 443 pupils (2015-16)
- Language: English
- Colors: Columbia Blue and White
- Song: Shenandoah Valley Alma Mater
- Fight song: On, Wisconsin!
- Athletics conference: Anthracite Football League/Schuylkill League
- Mascot: Blue Devils
- Yearbook: The Mirror
- Feeder schools: Shenandoah Valley Elementary School
- Website: Shenandoah Valley School District website

Shenandoah Valley Junior Senior High School is a small suburban, public junior senior high school located at 805 West Centre Street in Shenandoah in Schuylkill County, Pennsylvania. In 2015, enrollment was reported as 443 pupils in 7th through 12th grades.

High school students may choose to attend Schuylkill Technology Centers for training in the construction trades, mechanical trades, as well as other careers. In 2015, 23 district pupils attended the tech school. The district also offers SV Virtual Academy for pupils who desire to attend school online. The Schuylkill Intermediate Unit IU29 provides the district with a wide variety of services like specialized education for disabled students and hearing, speech and visual disability services and professional development for staff and faculty.
