= 1940 Texas A&M Aggies football team =

American college football season

1940 Texas A&M Aggies football

SWC co-champion Cotton Bowl Classic champion

Cotton Bowl Classic, W 13–12 vs. Fordham
- Conference: Southwest Conference

Ranking
- AP: No. 6
- Record: 9–1 (5–1 SWC)
- Head coach: Homer Norton (7th season)
- Home stadium: Kyle Field

1940 Southwest Conference football standings
	Conf.					Overall
Team	W		L		T	W		L		T
No. 6 Texas A&M $	5	–	1	–	0	9	–	1	–	0
No. 16 SMU	5	–	1	–	0	8	–	1	–	1
Texas	4	–	2	–	0	8	–	2	–	0
Rice	4	–	2	–	0	7	–	3	–	0
TCU	2	–	4	–	0	3	–	7	–	0
Arkansas	1	–	5	–	0	4	–	6	–	0
Baylor	0	–	6	–	0	4	–	6	–	0
$ – Conference champion; Rankings from AP Poll

The 1940 Texas A&M Aggies football team represented the Agricultural and Mechanical College of Texas—now known as Texas A&M University—as a member of the Southwest Conference (SWC) during the 1940 college football season. In their seventh year under head coach Homer Norton, the Aggies compiled a 9–1 record (5–1 against SWC opponents), tied for the SWC championship, were ranked No. 6 in the final AP poll, and defeated Fordham in the 1941 Cotton Bowl Classic. They played their home games at Kyle Field in College Station, Texas.

== Schedule ==
Date	Opponent	Rank	Site	Result	Attendance	Source
September 28	Texas A&I*		Kyle Field; College Station, TX	W 26–0		
October 5	vs. Tulsa*		Alamo Stadium; San Antonio, TX	W 41–6	> 20,000	
October 12	at UCLA*		Los Angeles Memorial Coliseum; Los Angeles, CA	W 7–0	60,000	
October 19	TCU	No. 2	Kyle Field; College Station, TX (rivalry)	W 21–7	22,000	
October 26	at Baylor	No. 4	Waco Stadium; Waco, TX (rivalry)	W 14–7	20,000	
November 2	Arkansas	No. 5	Kyle Field; College Station, TX (rivalry)	W 17–0		
November 9	at No. 14 SMU	No. 4	Ownby Stadium; University Park, TX	W 19–7	27,000	
November 16	Rice	No. 3	Kyle Field; College Station, TX	W 25–0	30,000	
November 28	at Texas	No. 2	War Memorial Stadium; Austin, TX (rivalry)	L 0–7	45,000	
January 1	vs. No. 12 Fordham*	No. 6	Cotton Bowl; Dallas, TX (Cotton Bowl Classic)	W 13–12	45,507	
*Non-conference game; Rankings from AP Poll released prior to the game

== Rankings ==
Ranking movements Legend: ██ Increase in ranking ██ Decrease in ranking ( ) = First-place votes
	Week							
Poll	1	2	3	4	5	6	7	Final
AP	2 (25)	4 (15)	5 (9)	4 (14)	3 (31.33)	2 (59)	2 (41)	6 (1)
